= List of numerical analysis topics =

This is a list of numerical analysis topics.

== General ==
- Validated numerics
- Iterative method
- Rate of convergence — the speed at which a convergent sequence approaches its limit
  - Order of accuracy — rate at which numerical solution of differential equation converges to exact solution
- Series acceleration — methods to accelerate the speed of convergence of a series
  - Aitken's delta-squared process — most useful for linearly converging sequences
  - Minimum polynomial extrapolation — for vector sequences
  - Richardson extrapolation
  - Shanks transformation — similar to Aitken's delta-squared process, but applied to the partial sums
  - Van Wijngaarden transformation — for accelerating the convergence of an alternating series
- Abramowitz and Stegun — book containing formulas and tables of many special functions
  - Digital Library of Mathematical Functions — successor of book by Abramowitz and Stegun
- Curse of dimensionality
- Local convergence and global convergence — whether you need a good initial guess to get convergence
- Superconvergence
- Discretization
- Difference quotient
- Complexity:
  - Computational complexity of mathematical operations
  - Smoothed analysis — measuring the expected performance of algorithms under slight random perturbations of worst-case inputs
- Symbolic-numeric computation — combination of symbolic and numeric methods
- Cultural and historical aspects:
  - History of numerical solution of differential equations using computers
  - Hundred-dollar, Hundred-digit Challenge problems — list of ten problems proposed by Nick Trefethen in 2002
  - Timeline of numerical analysis after 1945
- General classes of methods:
  - Collocation method — discretizes a continuous equation by requiring it only to hold at certain points
  - Level-set method
    - Level set (data structures) — data structures for representing level sets
  - Sinc numerical methods — methods based on the sinc function, sinc(x) = sin(x) / x
  - ABS methods

== Error ==
Error analysis (mathematics)

- Approximation
- Approximation error
- Catastrophic cancellation
- Condition number
- Discretization error
- Floating point number
  - Guard digit — extra precision introduced during a computation to reduce round-off error
  - Truncation — rounding a floating-point number by discarding all digits after a certain digit
  - Round-off error
    - Numeric precision in Microsoft Excel
  - Arbitrary-precision arithmetic
- Interval arithmetic — represent every number by two floating-point numbers guaranteed to have the unknown number between them
  - Interval contractor — maps interval to subinterval which still contains the unknown exact answer
  - Interval propagation — contracting interval domains without removing any value consistent with the constraints
    - See also: Interval boundary element method, Interval finite element
- Loss of significance
- Numerical error
- Numerical stability
- Error propagation:
  - Propagation of uncertainty
  - Residual (numerical analysis)
- Relative change and difference — the relative difference between x and y is |x − y| / max(|x|, |y|)
- Significant figures
  - Artificial precision — when a numerical value or semantic is expressed with more precision than was initially provided from measurement or user input
  - False precision — giving more significant figures than appropriate
- Sterbenz lemma
- Truncation error — error committed by doing only a finite numbers of steps
- Well-posed problem
- Affine arithmetic

== Elementary and special functions ==
- Unrestricted algorithm
- Summation:
  - Kahan summation algorithm
  - Pairwise summation — slightly worse than Kahan summation but cheaper
  - Binary splitting
  - 2Sum
- Multiplication:
  - Multiplication algorithm — general discussion, simple methods
  - Karatsuba algorithm — the first algorithm which is faster than straightforward multiplication
  - Toom–Cook multiplication — generalization of Karatsuba multiplication
  - Schönhage–Strassen algorithm — based on Fourier transform, asymptotically very fast
  - Fürer's algorithm — asymptotically slightly faster than Schönhage–Strassen
- Division algorithm — for computing quotient and/or remainder of two numbers
  - Long division
  - Restoring division
  - Non-restoring division
  - SRT division
  - Newton–Raphson division: uses Newton's method to find the reciprocal of D, and multiply that reciprocal by N to find the final quotient Q.
  - Goldschmidt division
- Exponentiation:
  - Exponentiation by squaring
  - Addition-chain exponentiation
- Multiplicative inverse Algorithms: for computing a number's multiplicative inverse (reciprocal).
  - Newton's method
- Polynomials:
  - Horner's method
  - Estrin's scheme — modification of the Horner scheme with more possibilities for parallelization
  - Clenshaw algorithm
  - De Casteljau's algorithm
- Square roots and other roots:
  - Integer square root
  - Methods of computing square roots
  - nth root algorithm
  - hypot — the function (x^{2} + y^{2})^{1/2}
  - Alpha max plus beta min algorithm — approximates hypot(x,y)
  - Fast inverse square root — calculates 1 / √x using details of the IEEE floating-point system
- Elementary functions (exponential, logarithm, trigonometric functions):
  - Trigonometric tables — different methods for generating them
  - CORDIC — shift-and-add algorithm using a table of arc tangents
  - BKM algorithm — shift-and-add algorithm using a table of logarithms and complex numbers
- Gamma function:
  - Lanczos approximation
  - Spouge's approximation — modification of Stirling's approximation; easier to apply than Lanczos
- AGM method — computes arithmetic–geometric mean; related methods compute special functions
- FEE method (Fast E-function Evaluation) — fast summation of series like the power series for e^{x}
- Gal's accurate tables — table of function values with unequal spacing to reduce round-off error
- Spigot algorithm — algorithms that can compute individual digits of a real number
- Approximations of π:
  - Liu Hui's π algorithm — first algorithm that can compute π to arbitrary precision
  - Leibniz formula for π — alternating series with very slow convergence
  - Wallis product — infinite product converging slowly to π/2
  - Viète's formula — more complicated infinite product which converges faster
  - Gauss–Legendre algorithm — iteration which converges quadratically to π, based on arithmetic–geometric mean
  - Borwein's algorithm — iteration which converges quartically to 1/π, and other algorithms
  - Chudnovsky algorithm — fast algorithm that calculates a hypergeometric series
  - Bailey–Borwein–Plouffe formula — can be used to compute individual hexadecimal digits of π
  - Bellard's formula — faster version of Bailey–Borwein–Plouffe formula
  - List of formulae involving π

== Numerical linear algebra ==
Numerical linear algebra — study of numerical algorithms for linear algebra problems

=== Basic concepts ===
- Types of matrices appearing in numerical analysis:
  - Sparse matrix
    - Band matrix
    - Bidiagonal matrix
    - Tridiagonal matrix
    - Pentadiagonal matrix
    - Skyline matrix
  - Circulant matrix
  - Triangular matrix
  - Diagonally dominant matrix
  - Block matrix — matrix composed of smaller matrices
  - Stieltjes matrix — symmetric positive definite with non-positive off-diagonal entries
  - Hilbert matrix — example of a matrix which is extremely ill-conditioned (and thus difficult to handle)
  - Wilkinson matrix — example of a symmetric tridiagonal matrix with pairs of nearly, but not exactly, equal eigenvalues
  - Convergent matrix — square matrix whose successive powers approach the zero matrix
- Algorithms for matrix multiplication:
  - Strassen algorithm
  - Coppersmith–Winograd algorithm
  - Cannon's algorithm — a distributed algorithm, especially suitable for processors laid out in a 2d grid
  - Freivalds' algorithm — a randomized algorithm for checking the result of a multiplication
- Matrix decompositions:
  - LU decomposition — lower triangular times upper triangular
  - QR decomposition — orthogonal matrix times triangular matrix
    - RRQR factorization — rank-revealing QR factorization, can be used to compute rank of a matrix
  - Polar decomposition — unitary matrix times positive-semidefinite Hermitian matrix
  - Decompositions by similarity:
    - Eigendecomposition — decomposition in terms of eigenvectors and eigenvalues
    - Jordan normal form — bidiagonal matrix of a certain form; generalizes the eigendecomposition
      - Weyr canonical form — permutation of Jordan normal form
    - Jordan–Chevalley decomposition — sum of commuting nilpotent matrix and diagonalizable matrix
    - Schur decomposition — similarity transform bringing the matrix to a triangular matrix
  - Singular value decomposition — unitary matrix times diagonal matrix times unitary matrix
- Matrix splitting — expressing a given matrix as a sum or difference of matrices

=== Solving systems of linear equations ===
- Gaussian elimination
  - Row echelon form — matrix in which all entries below a nonzero entry are zero
  - Bareiss algorithm — variant which ensures that all entries remain integers if the initial matrix has integer entries
  - Tridiagonal matrix algorithm — simplified form of Gaussian elimination for tridiagonal matrices
- LU decomposition — write a matrix as a product of an upper- and a lower-triangular matrix
  - Crout matrix decomposition
  - LU reduction — a special parallelized version of a LU decomposition algorithm
- Block LU decomposition
- Cholesky decomposition — for solving a system with a positive definite matrix
  - Minimum degree algorithm
  - Symbolic Cholesky decomposition
- Iterative refinement — procedure to turn an inaccurate solution in a more accurate one
- Direct methods for sparse matrices:
  - Frontal solver — used in finite element methods
  - Nested dissection — for symmetric matrices, based on graph partitioning
- Levinson recursion — for Toeplitz matrices
- SPIKE algorithm — hybrid parallel solver for narrow-banded matrices
- Cyclic reduction — eliminate even or odd rows or columns, repeat
- Iterative methods:
  - Jacobi method
  - Gauss–Seidel method
    - Successive over-relaxation (SOR) — a technique to accelerate the Gauss–Seidel method
      - Symmetric successive over-relaxation (SSOR) — variant of SOR for symmetric matrices
    - Backfitting algorithm — iterative procedure used to fit a generalized additive model, often equivalent to Gauss–Seidel
  - Modified Richardson iteration
  - Conjugate gradient method (CG) — assumes that the matrix is positive definite
    - Derivation of the conjugate gradient method
    - Nonlinear conjugate gradient method — generalization for nonlinear optimization problems
  - Biconjugate gradient method (BiCG)
    - Biconjugate gradient stabilized method (BiCGSTAB) — variant of BiCG with better convergence
  - Conjugate residual method — similar to CG but only assumed that the matrix is symmetric
  - Generalized minimal residual method (GMRES) — based on the Arnoldi iteration
  - Chebyshev iteration — avoids inner products but needs bounds on the spectrum
  - Stone's method (SIP — Strongly Implicit Procedure) — uses an incomplete LU decomposition
  - Kaczmarz method
  - Preconditioner
    - Incomplete Cholesky factorization — sparse approximation to the Cholesky factorization
    - Incomplete LU factorization — sparse approximation to the LU factorization
  - Uzawa iteration — for saddle node problems
- Underdetermined and overdetermined systems (systems that have no or more than one solution):
  - Numerical computation of null space — find all solutions of an underdetermined system
  - Moore–Penrose pseudoinverse — for finding solution with smallest 2-norm (for underdetermined systems) or smallest residual
  - Sparse approximation — for finding the sparsest solution (i.e., the solution with as many zeros as possible)

=== Eigenvalue algorithms ===
Eigenvalue algorithm — a numerical algorithm for locating the eigenvalues of a matrix

- Power iteration
- Inverse iteration
- Rayleigh quotient iteration
- Arnoldi iteration — based on Krylov subspaces
- Lanczos algorithm — Arnoldi, specialized for positive-definite matrices
  - Block Lanczos algorithm — for when matrix is over a finite field
- QR algorithm
- Jacobi eigenvalue algorithm — select a small submatrix which can be diagonalized exactly, and repeat
  - Jacobi rotation — the building block, almost a Givens rotation
  - Jacobi method for complex Hermitian matrices
- Divide-and-conquer eigenvalue algorithm
- Folded spectrum method
- LOBPCG — Locally Optimal Block Preconditioned Conjugate Gradient Method
- Eigenvalue perturbation — stability of eigenvalues under perturbations of the matrix

=== Other concepts and algorithms ===
- Orthogonalization algorithms:
  - Gram–Schmidt process
  - Householder transformation
    - Householder operator — analogue of Householder transformation for general inner product spaces
  - Givens rotation
- Krylov subspace
- Block matrix pseudoinverse
- Bidiagonalization
- Cuthill–McKee algorithm — permutes rows/columns in sparse matrix to yield a narrow band matrix
- In-place matrix transposition — computing the transpose of a matrix without using much additional storage
- Pivot element — entry in a matrix on which the algorithm concentrates
- Matrix-free methods — methods that only access the matrix by evaluating matrix-vector products

== Interpolation and approximation ==
Interpolation — construct a function going through some given data points

- Nearest-neighbor interpolation — takes the value of the nearest neighbor

=== Polynomial interpolation ===
Polynomial interpolation — interpolation by polynomials

- Linear interpolation
- Runge's phenomenon
- Vandermonde matrix
- Chebyshev polynomials
- Chebyshev nodes
- Lebesgue constants
- Different forms for the interpolant:
  - Newton polynomial
    - Divided differences
    - Neville's algorithm — for evaluating the interpolant; based on the Newton form
  - Lagrange polynomial
  - Bernstein polynomial — especially useful for approximation
  - Brahmagupta's interpolation formula — seventh-century formula for quadratic interpolation
- Extensions to multiple dimensions:
  - Bilinear interpolation
  - Trilinear interpolation
  - Bicubic interpolation
  - Tricubic interpolation
  - Padua points — set of points in R^{2} with unique polynomial interpolant and minimal growth of Lebesgue constant
- Hermite interpolation
- Birkhoff interpolation
- Abel–Goncharov interpolation

=== Spline interpolation ===
Spline interpolation — interpolation by piecewise polynomials

- Spline (mathematics) — the piecewise polynomials used as interpolants
- Perfect spline — polynomial spline of degree m whose mth derivate is ±1
- Cubic Hermite spline
  - Centripetal Catmull–Rom spline — special case of cubic Hermite splines without self-intersections or cusps
- Monotone cubic interpolation
- Hermite spline
- Bézier curve
  - De Casteljau's algorithm
  - composite Bézier curve
  - Generalizations to more dimensions:
    - Bézier triangle — maps a triangle to R^{3}
    - Bézier surface — maps a square to R^{3}
- B-spline
  - Box spline — multivariate generalization of B-splines
  - Truncated power function
  - De Boor's algorithm — generalizes De Casteljau's algorithm
- Non-uniform rational B-spline (NURBS)
  - T-spline — can be thought of as a NURBS surface for which a row of control points is allowed to terminate
- Kochanek–Bartels spline
- Coons patch — type of manifold parametrization used to smoothly join other surfaces together
- M-spline — a non-negative spline
- I-spline — a monotone spline, defined in terms of M-splines
- Smoothing spline — a spline fitted smoothly to noisy data
- Blossom (functional) — a unique, affine, symmetric map associated to a polynomial or spline
- See also: List of numerical computational geometry topics

=== Trigonometric interpolation ===
Trigonometric interpolation — interpolation by trigonometric polynomials

- Discrete Fourier transform — can be viewed as trigonometric interpolation at equidistant points
  - Relations between Fourier transforms and Fourier series
- Fast Fourier transform (FFT) — a fast method for computing the discrete Fourier transform
  - Bluestein's FFT algorithm
  - Bruun's FFT algorithm
  - Cooley–Tukey FFT algorithm
  - Split-radix FFT algorithm — variant of Cooley–Tukey that uses a blend of radices 2 and 4
  - Goertzel algorithm
  - Prime-factor FFT algorithm
  - Rader's FFT algorithm
  - Bit-reversal permutation — particular permutation of vectors with 2^{m} entries used in many FFTs.
  - Butterfly diagram
  - Twiddle factor — the trigonometric constant coefficients that are multiplied by the data
  - Cyclotomic fast Fourier transform — for FFT over finite fields
  - Methods for computing discrete convolutions with finite impulse response filters using the FFT:
    - Overlap–add method
    - Overlap–save method
- Sigma approximation
- Dirichlet kernel — convolving any function with the Dirichlet kernel yields its trigonometric interpolant
- Gibbs phenomenon

=== Other interpolants ===
- Simple rational approximation
  - Polynomial and rational function modeling — comparison of polynomial and rational interpolation
- Wavelet
  - Continuous wavelet
  - Transfer matrix
  - See also: List of functional analysis topics, List of wavelet-related transforms
- Inverse distance weighting
- Radial basis function (RBF) — a function of the form ƒ(x) = φ(|x−x_{0}|)
  - Polyharmonic spline — a commonly used radial basis function
  - Thin plate spline — a specific polyharmonic spline: r^{2} log r
  - Hierarchical RBF
- Subdivision surface — constructed by recursively subdividing a piecewise linear interpolant
  - Catmull–Clark subdivision surface
  - Doo–Sabin subdivision surface
  - Loop subdivision surface
- Slerp (spherical linear interpolation) — interpolation between two points on a sphere
  - Generalized quaternion interpolation — generalizes slerp for interpolation between more than two quaternions
- Irrational base discrete weighted transform
- Nevanlinna–Pick interpolation — interpolation by analytic functions in the unit disc subject to a bound
  - Pick matrix — the Nevanlinna–Pick interpolation has a solution if this matrix is positive semi-definite
- Multivariate interpolation — the function being interpolated depends on more than one variable
  - Barnes interpolation — method for two-dimensional functions using Gaussians common in meteorology
  - Coons surface — combination of linear interpolation and bilinear interpolation
  - Lanczos resampling — based on convolution with a sinc function
  - Natural neighbor interpolation
  - PDE surface
  - Transfinite interpolation — constructs function on planar domain given its values on the boundary
  - Trend surface analysis — based on low-order polynomials of spatial coordinates; uses scattered observations
  - Method based on polynomials are listed under Polynomial interpolation

=== Approximation theory ===
Approximation theory

- Orders of approximation
- Lebesgue's lemma
- Curve fitting
  - Vector field reconstruction
- Modulus of continuity — measures smoothness of a function
- Least squares (function approximation) — minimizes the error in the L^{2}-norm
- Minimax approximation algorithm — minimizes the maximum error over an interval (the L^{∞}-norm)
  - Equioscillation theorem — characterizes the best approximation in the L^{∞}-norm
- Unisolvent point set — function from given function space is determined uniquely by values on such a set of points
- Stone–Weierstrass theorem — continuous functions can be approximated uniformly by polynomials, or certain other function spaces
- Approximation by polynomials:
  - Linear approximation
  - Bernstein polynomial — basis of polynomials useful for approximating a function
  - Bernstein's constant — error when approximating |x| by a polynomial
  - Remez algorithm — for constructing the best polynomial approximation in the L^{∞}-norm
  - Bernstein's inequality (mathematical analysis) — bound on maximum of derivative of polynomial in unit disk
  - Mergelyan's theorem — generalization of Stone–Weierstrass theorem for polynomials
  - Müntz–Szász theorem — variant of Stone–Weierstrass theorem for polynomials if some coefficients have to be zero
  - Bramble–Hilbert lemma — upper bound on L^{p} error of polynomial approximation in multiple dimensions
  - Discrete Chebyshev polynomials — polynomials orthogonal with respect to a discrete measure
  - Favard's theorem — polynomials satisfying suitable 3-term recurrence relations are orthogonal polynomials
- Approximation by Fourier series / trigonometric polynomials:
  - Jackson's inequality — upper bound for best approximation by a trigonometric polynomial
    - Bernstein's theorem (approximation theory) — a converse to Jackson's inequality
  - Fejér's theorem — Cesàro means of partial sums of Fourier series converge uniformly for continuous periodic functions
  - Erdős–Turán inequality — bounds distance between probability and Lebesgue measure in terms of Fourier coefficients
- Different approximations:
  - Moving least squares
  - Padé approximant
    - Padé table — table of Padé approximants
  - Hartogs–Rosenthal theorem — continuous functions can be approximated uniformly by rational functions on a set of Lebesgue measure zero
  - Szász–Mirakyan operator — approximation by e^{−n} x^{k} on a semi-infinite interval
  - Szász–Mirakjan–Kantorovich operator
  - Baskakov operator — generalize Bernstein polynomials, Szász–Mirakyan operators, and Lupas operators
  - Favard operator — approximation by sums of Gaussians
- Surrogate model — application: replacing a function that is hard to evaluate by a simpler function
- Constructive function theory — field that studies connection between degree of approximation and smoothness
- Universal differential equation — differential–algebraic equation whose solutions can approximate any continuous function
- Fekete problem — find N points on a sphere that minimize some kind of energy
- Carleman's condition — condition guaranteeing that a measure is uniquely determined by its moments
- Krein's condition — condition that exponential sums are dense in weighted L^{2} space
- Lethargy theorem — about distance of points in a metric space from members of a sequence of subspaces
- Wirtinger's representation and projection theorem
- Journals:
  - Constructive Approximation
  - Journal of Approximation Theory

=== Miscellaneous ===
- Extrapolation
  - Linear predictive analysis — linear extrapolation
- Unisolvent functions — functions for which the interpolation problem has a unique solution
- Regression analysis
  - Isotonic regression
- Curve-fitting compaction
- Interpolation (computer graphics)

== Finding roots of nonlinear equations ==
See #Numerical linear algebra for linear equations

Root-finding algorithm — algorithms for solving the equation f(x) = 0

- General methods:
  - Bisection method — simple and robust; linear convergence
    - Lehmer–Schur algorithm — variant for complex functions
  - Fixed-point iteration
  - Newton's method — based on linear approximation around the current iterate; quadratic convergence
    - Kantorovich theorem — gives a region around solution such that Newton's method converges
    - Newton fractal — indicates which initial condition converges to which root under Newton iteration
    - Quasi-Newton method — uses an approximation of the Jacobian:
      - Broyden's method — uses a rank-one update for the Jacobian
      - Symmetric rank-one — a symmetric (but not necessarily positive definite) rank-one update of the Jacobian
      - Davidon–Fletcher–Powell formula — update of the Jacobian in which the matrix remains positive definite
      - Broyden–Fletcher–Goldfarb–Shanno algorithm — rank-two update of the Jacobian in which the matrix remains positive definite
      - Limited-memory BFGS method — truncated, matrix-free variant of BFGS method suitable for large problems
    - Steffensen's method — uses divided differences instead of the derivative
  - Secant method — based on linear interpolation at last two iterates
  - False position method — secant method with ideas from the bisection method
  - Muller's method — based on quadratic interpolation at last three iterates
  - Sidi's generalized secant method — higher-order variants of secant method
  - Inverse quadratic interpolation — similar to Muller's method, but interpolates the inverse
  - Brent's method — combines bisection method, secant method and inverse quadratic interpolation
  - Ridders' method — fits a linear function times an exponential to last two iterates and their midpoint
  - Halley's method — uses f, f' and f''; achieves the cubic convergence
  - Householder's method — uses first d derivatives to achieve order d + 1; generalizes Newton's and Halley's method
- Methods for polynomials:
  - Aberth method
  - Bairstow's method
  - Durand–Kerner method
  - Graeffe's method
  - Jenkins–Traub algorithm — fast, reliable, and widely used
  - Laguerre's method
  - Splitting circle method
- Analysis:
  - Wilkinson's polynomial
- Numerical continuation — tracking a root as one parameter in the equation changes
  - Piecewise linear continuation

== Optimization ==
Mathematical optimization — algorithm for finding maxima or minima of a given function

=== Basic concepts ===
- Active set
- Candidate solution
- Constraint (mathematics)
  - Constrained optimization — studies optimization problems with constraints
  - Binary constraint — a constraint that involves exactly two variables
- Corner solution
- Feasible region — contains all solutions that satisfy the constraints but may not be optimal
- Global optimum and Local optimum
- Maxima and minima
- Slack variable
- Continuous optimization
- Discrete optimization

=== Linear programming ===
Linear programming (also treats integer programming) — objective function and constraints are linear

- Algorithms for linear programming:
  - Simplex algorithm
    - Bland's rule — rule to avoid cycling in the simplex method
    - Klee–Minty cube — perturbed (hyper)cube; simplex method has exponential complexity on such a domain
    - Criss-cross algorithm — similar to the simplex algorithm
    - Big M method — variation of simplex algorithm for problems with both "less than" and "greater than" constraints
  - Interior point method
    - Ellipsoid method
    - Karmarkar's algorithm
    - Mehrotra predictor–corrector method
  - Column generation
  - k-approximation of k-hitting set — algorithm for specific LP problems (to find a weighted hitting set)
- Linear complementarity problem
- Decompositions:
  - Benders' decomposition
  - Dantzig–Wolfe decomposition
  - Theory of two-level planning
  - Variable splitting
- Basic solution (linear programming) — solution at vertex of feasible region
- Fourier–Motzkin elimination
- Hilbert basis (linear programming) — set of integer vectors in a convex cone which generate all integer vectors in the cone
- LP-type problem
- Linear inequality
- Vertex enumeration problem — list all vertices of the feasible set

=== Convex optimization ===
Convex optimization

- Quadratic programming
  - Linear least squares (mathematics)
  - Total least squares
  - Frank–Wolfe algorithm
  - Sequential minimal optimization — breaks up large QP problems into a series of smallest possible QP problems
  - Bilinear program
- Basis pursuit — minimize L_{1}-norm of vector subject to linear constraints
  - Basis pursuit denoising (BPDN) — regularized version of basis pursuit
    - In-crowd algorithm — algorithm for solving basis pursuit denoising
- Linear matrix inequality
- Conic optimization
  - Semidefinite programming
  - Second-order cone programming
  - Sum-of-squares optimization
  - Quadratic programming (see above)
- Bregman method — row-action method for strictly convex optimization problems
- Proximal gradient method — use splitting of objective function in sum of possible non-differentiable pieces
- Subgradient method — extension of steepest descent for problems with a non-differentiable objective function
- Biconvex optimization — generalization where objective function and constraint set can be biconvex

=== Nonlinear programming ===
Nonlinear programming — the most general optimization problem in the usual framework

- Special cases of nonlinear programming:
  - See Linear programming and Convex optimization above
  - Geometric programming — problems involving signomials or posynomials
    - Signomial — similar to polynomials, but exponents need not be integers
    - Posynomial — a signomial with positive coefficients
  - Quadratically constrained quadratic program
  - Linear-fractional programming — objective is ratio of linear functions, constraints are linear
    - Fractional programming — objective is ratio of nonlinear functions, constraints are linear
  - Nonlinear complementarity problem (NCP) — find x such that x ≥ 0, f(x) ≥ 0 and x^{T} f(x) = 0
  - Least squares — the objective function is a sum of squares
    - Non-linear least squares
    - Gauss–Newton algorithm
      - BHHH algorithm — variant of Gauss–Newton in econometrics
      - Generalized Gauss–Newton method — for constrained nonlinear least-squares problems
    - Levenberg–Marquardt algorithm
    - Iteratively reweighted least squares (IRLS) — solves a weighted least-squares problem at every iteration
    - Partial least squares — statistical techniques similar to principal components analysis
      - Non-linear iterative partial least squares (NIPLS)
  - Mathematical programming with equilibrium constraints — constraints include variational inequalities or complementarities
  - Univariate optimization:
    - Golden section search
    - Successive parabolic interpolation — based on quadratic interpolation through the last three iterates
- General algorithms:
  - Concepts:
    - Descent direction
    - Guess value — the initial guess for a solution with which an algorithm starts
    - Line search
      - Backtracking line search
      - Wolfe conditions
  - Gradient method — method that uses the gradient as the search direction
    - Gradient descent
      - Stochastic gradient descent
    - Landweber iteration — mainly used for ill-posed problems
  - Successive linear programming (SLP) — replace problem by a linear programming problem, solve that, and repeat
  - Sequential quadratic programming (SQP) — replace problem by a quadratic programming problem, solve that, and repeat
  - Newton's method in optimization
    - See also under Newton algorithm in the section Finding roots of nonlinear equations
  - Nonlinear conjugate gradient method
  - Derivative-free methods
    - Coordinate descent — move in one of the coordinate directions
      - Adaptive coordinate descent — adapt coordinate directions to objective function
      - Random coordinate descent — randomized version
    - Nelder–Mead method
    - Pattern search (optimization)
    - Powell's method — based on conjugate gradient descent
    - Rosenbrock methods — derivative-free method, similar to Nelder–Mead but with guaranteed convergence
  - Augmented Lagrangian method — replaces constrained problems by unconstrained problems with a term added to the objective function
  - Ternary search
  - Tabu search
  - Guided Local Search — modification of search algorithms which builds up penalties during a search
  - Reactive search optimization (RSO) — the algorithm adapts its parameters automatically
  - MM algorithm — majorize-minimization, a wide framework of methods
  - Least absolute deviations
    - Expectation–maximization algorithm
      - Ordered subset expectation maximization
  - Nearest neighbor search
  - Space mapping — uses "coarse" (ideal or low-fidelity) and "fine" (practical or high-fidelity) models

=== Optimal control and infinite-dimensional optimization ===
Optimal control

- Pontryagin's minimum principle — infinite-dimensional version of Lagrange multipliers
  - Costate equations — equation for the "Lagrange multipliers" in Pontryagin's minimum principle
  - Hamiltonian (control theory) — minimum principle says that this function should be minimized
- Types of problems:
  - Linear-quadratic regulator — system dynamics is a linear differential equation, objective is quadratic
  - Linear-quadratic-Gaussian control (LQG) — system dynamics is a linear SDE with additive noise, objective is quadratic
    - Optimal projection equations — method for reducing dimension of LQG control problem
- Algebraic Riccati equation — matrix equation occurring in many optimal control problems
- Bang–bang control — control that switches abruptly between two states
- Covector mapping principle
- Differential dynamic programming — uses locally-quadratic models of the dynamics and cost functions
- DNSS point — initial state for certain optimal control problems with multiple optimal solutions
- Legendre–Clebsch condition — second-order condition for solution of optimal control problem
- Pseudospectral optimal control
  - Bellman pseudospectral method — based on Bellman's principle of optimality
  - Chebyshev pseudospectral method — uses Chebyshev polynomials (of the first kind)
  - Flat pseudospectral method — combines Ross–Fahroo pseudospectral method with differential flatness
  - Gauss pseudospectral method — uses collocation at the Legendre–Gauss points
  - Legendre pseudospectral method — uses Legendre polynomials
  - Pseudospectral knotting method — generalization of pseudospectral methods in optimal control
  - Ross–Fahroo pseudospectral method — class of pseudospectral method including Chebyshev, Legendre and knotting
- Ross–Fahroo lemma — condition to make discretization and duality operations commute
- Ross' π lemma — there is fundamental time constant within which a control solution must be computed for controllability and stability
- Sethi model — optimal control problem modelling advertising

Infinite-dimensional optimization

- Semi-infinite programming — infinite number of variables and finite number of constraints, or other way around
- Shape optimization, Topology optimization — optimization over a set of regions
  - Topological derivative — derivative with respect to changing in the shape
- Generalized semi-infinite programming — finite number of variables, infinite number of constraints

=== Uncertainty and randomness ===
- Approaches to deal with uncertainty:
  - Markov decision process
  - Partially observable Markov decision process
  - Robust optimization
    - Wald's maximin model
  - Scenario optimization — constraints are uncertain
  - Stochastic approximation
  - Stochastic optimization
  - Stochastic programming
  - Stochastic gradient descent
- Random optimization algorithms:
  - Random search — choose a point randomly in ball around current iterate
  - Simulated annealing
    - Adaptive simulated annealing — variant in which the algorithm parameters are adjusted during the computation.
    - Great Deluge algorithm
    - Mean field annealing — deterministic variant of simulated annealing
  - Bayesian optimization — treats objective function as a random function and places a prior over it
  - Evolutionary algorithm
    - Differential evolution
    - Evolutionary programming
    - Genetic algorithm, Genetic programming
      - Genetic algorithms in economics
    - MCACEA (Multiple Coordinated Agents Coevolution Evolutionary Algorithm) — uses an evolutionary algorithm for every agent
    - Simultaneous perturbation stochastic approximation (SPSA)
  - Luus–Jaakola
  - Particle swarm optimization
  - Stochastic tunneling
  - Harmony search — mimics the improvisation process of musicians
  - see also the section Monte Carlo method

=== Theoretical aspects ===
- Convex analysis — function f such that f(tx + (1 − t)y) ≥ tf(x) + (1 − t)f(y) for t ∈ [0,1]
  - Pseudoconvex function — function f such that ∇f · (y − x) ≥ 0 implies f(y) ≥ f(x)
  - Quasiconvex function — function f such that f(tx + (1 − t)y) ≤ max(f(x), f(y)) for t ∈ [0,1]
  - Subderivative
  - Geodesic convexity — convexity for functions defined on a Riemannian manifold
- Duality (optimization)
  - Weak duality — dual solution gives a bound on the primal solution
  - Strong duality — primal and dual solutions are equivalent
  - Shadow price
  - Dual cone and polar cone
  - Duality gap — difference between primal and dual solution
  - Fenchel's duality theorem — relates minimization problems with maximization problems of convex conjugates
  - Perturbation function — any function which relates to primal and dual problems
  - Slater's condition — sufficient condition for strong duality to hold in a convex optimization problem
  - Total dual integrality — concept of duality for integer linear programming
  - Wolfe duality — for when objective function and constraints are differentiable
- Farkas' lemma
- Karush–Kuhn–Tucker conditions (KKT) — sufficient conditions for a solution to be optimal
  - Fritz John conditions — variant of KKT conditions
- Lagrange multiplier
  - Lagrange multipliers on Banach spaces
- Semi-continuity
- Complementarity theory — study of problems with constraints of the form ⟨u, v⟩ = 0
  - Mixed complementarity problem
    - Mixed linear complementarity problem
    - Lemke's algorithm — method for solving (mixed) linear complementarity problems
- Danskin's theorem — used in the analysis of minimax problems
- Maximum theorem — the maximum and maximizer are continuous as function of parameters, under some conditions
- No free lunch in search and optimization
- Relaxation (approximation) — approximating a given problem by an easier problem by relaxing some constraints
  - Lagrangian relaxation
  - Linear programming relaxation — ignoring the integrality constraints in a linear programming problem
- Self-concordant function
- Reduced cost — cost for increasing a variable by a small amount
- Hardness of approximation — computational complexity of getting an approximate solution

=== Applications ===
- In geometry:
  - Geometric median — the point minimizing the sum of distances to a given set of points
  - Chebyshev center — the centre of the smallest ball containing a given set of points
- In statistics:
  - Iterated conditional modes — maximizing joint probability of Markov random field
  - Response surface methodology — used in the design of experiments
- Automatic label placement
- Compressed sensing — reconstruct a signal from knowledge that it is sparse or compressible
- Cutting stock problem
- Demand optimization
- Destination dispatch — an optimization technique for dispatching elevators
- Energy minimization
- Entropy maximization
- Highly optimized tolerance
- Hyperparameter optimization
- Inventory control problem
  - Newsvendor model
  - Extended newsvendor model
  - Assemble-to-order system
- Linear programming decoding
- Linear search problem — find a point on a line by moving along the line
- Low-rank approximation — find best approximation, constraint is that rank of some matrix is smaller than a given number
- Meta-optimization — optimization of the parameters in an optimization method
- Multidisciplinary design optimization
- Optimal computing budget allocation — maximize the overall simulation efficiency for finding an optimal decision
- Paper bag problem
- Process optimization
- Recursive economics — individuals make a series of two-period optimization decisions over time.
- Stigler diet
- Space allocation problem
- Stress majorization
- Trajectory optimization
- Transportation theory
- Wing-shape optimization

=== Miscellaneous ===
- Combinatorial optimization
- Dynamic programming
  - Bellman equation
  - Hamilton–Jacobi–Bellman equation — continuous-time analogue of Bellman equation
  - Backward induction — solving dynamic programming problems by reasoning backwards in time
  - Optimal stopping — choosing the optimal time to take a particular action
    - Odds algorithm
    - Robbins' problem
- Global optimization:
  - BRST algorithm
  - MCS algorithm
- Multi-objective optimization — there are multiple conflicting objectives
  - Benson's algorithm — for linear vector optimization problems
- Bilevel optimization — studies problems in which one problem is embedded in another
- Optimal substructure
- Dykstra's projection algorithm — finds a point in intersection of two convex sets
- Algorithmic concepts:
  - Barrier function
  - Penalty method
  - Trust region
- Test functions for optimization:
  - Rosenbrock function — two-dimensional function with a banana-shaped valley
  - Himmelblau's function — two-dimensional with four local minima, defined by $f(x, y) = (x^2+y-11)^2 + (x+y^2-7)^2$
  - Rastrigin function — two-dimensional function with many local minima
  - Shekel function — multimodal and multidimensional
- Mathematical Optimization Society

== Numerical quadrature (integration) ==
Numerical integration — the numerical evaluation of an integral

- Rectangle method — first-order method, based on (piecewise) constant approximation
- Trapezoidal rule — second-order method, based on (piecewise) linear approximation
- Simpson's rule — fourth-order method, based on (piecewise) quadratic approximation
  - Adaptive Simpson's method
- Boole's rule — sixth-order method, based on the values at five equidistant points
- Newton–Cotes formulas — generalizes the above methods
- Romberg's method — Richardson extrapolation applied to trapezium rule
- Gaussian quadrature — highest possible degree with given number of points
  - Chebyshev–Gauss quadrature — extension of Gaussian quadrature for integrals with weight (1 − x^{2})^{±1/2} on [−1, 1]
  - Gauss–Hermite quadrature — extension of Gaussian quadrature for integrals with weight exp(−x^{2}) on [−∞, ∞]
  - Gauss–Jacobi quadrature — extension of Gaussian quadrature for integrals with weight (1 − x)^{α} (1 + x)^{β} on [−1, 1]
  - Gauss–Laguerre quadrature — extension of Gaussian quadrature for integrals with weight exp(−x) on [0, ∞]
  - Gauss–Kronrod quadrature formula — nested rule based on Gaussian quadrature
  - Gauss–Kronrod rules
- Tanh–sinh quadrature — variant of Gaussian quadrature which works well with singularities at the end points
- Clenshaw–Curtis quadrature — based on expanding the integrand in terms of Chebyshev polynomials
- Adaptive quadrature — adapting the subintervals in which the integration interval is divided depending on the integrand
- Monte Carlo integration — takes random samples of the integrand
  - See also #Monte Carlo method
- Quantized state systems method (QSS) — based on the idea of state quantization
- Lebedev quadrature — uses a grid on a sphere with octahedral symmetry
- Sparse grid
- Coopmans approximation
- Numerical differentiation — for fractional-order integrals
  - Numerical smoothing and differentiation
  - Adjoint state method — approximates gradient of a function in an optimization problem
- Euler–Maclaurin formula

== Numerical methods for ordinary differential equations ==
Numerical methods for ordinary differential equations — the numerical solution of ordinary differential equations (ODEs)

- Euler method — the most basic method for solving an ODE
- Explicit and implicit methods — implicit methods need to solve an equation at every step
- Backward Euler method — implicit variant of the Euler method
- Trapezoidal rule — second-order implicit method
- Runge–Kutta methods — one of the two main classes of methods for initial-value problems
  - Midpoint method — a second-order method with two stages
  - Heun's method — either a second-order method with two stages, or a third-order method with three stages
  - Bogacki–Shampine method — a third-order method with four stages (FSAL) and an embedded fourth-order method
  - Cash–Karp method — a fifth-order method with six stages and an embedded fourth-order method
  - Dormand–Prince method — a fifth-order method with seven stages (FSAL) and an embedded fourth-order method
  - Runge–Kutta–Fehlberg method — a fifth-order method with six stages and an embedded fourth-order method
  - Gauss–Legendre method — family of A-stable method with optimal order based on Gaussian quadrature
  - Butcher group — algebraic formalism involving rooted trees for analysing Runge–Kutta methods
  - List of Runge–Kutta methods
- Linear multistep method — the other main class of methods for initial-value problems
  - Backward differentiation formula — implicit methods of order 2 to 6; especially suitable for stiff equations
  - Numerov's method — fourth-order method for equations of the form $y'' = f(t,y)$
  - Predictor–corrector method — uses one method to approximate solution and another one to increase accuracy
- General linear methods — a class of methods encapsulating linear multistep and Runge-Kutta methods
- Bulirsch–Stoer algorithm — combines the midpoint method with Richardson extrapolation to attain arbitrary order
- Exponential integrator — based on splitting ODE in a linear part, which is solved exactly, and a nonlinear part
- Methods designed for the solution of ODEs from classical physics:
  - Newmark-beta method — based on the extended mean-value theorem
  - Verlet integration — a popular second-order method
  - Leapfrog integration — another name for Verlet integration
  - Beeman's algorithm — a two-step method extending the Verlet method
  - Dynamic relaxation
- Geometric integrator — a method that preserves some geometric structure of the equation
  - Symplectic integrator — a method for the solution of Hamilton's equations that preserves the symplectic structure
    - Variational integrator — symplectic integrators derived using the underlying variational principle
    - Semi-implicit Euler method — variant of Euler method which is symplectic when applied to separable Hamiltonians
  - Energy drift — phenomenon that energy, which should be conserved, drifts away due to numerical errors
- Other methods for initial value problems (IVPs):
  - Bi-directional delay line
  - Partial element equivalent circuit
- Methods for solving two-point boundary value problems (BVPs):
  - Shooting method
  - Direct multiple shooting method — divides interval in several subintervals and applies the shooting method on each subinterval
- Methods for solving differential-algebraic equations (DAEs), i.e., ODEs with constraints:
  - Constraint algorithm — for solving Newton's equations with constraints
  - Pantelides algorithm — for reducing the index of a DEA
- Methods for solving stochastic differential equations (SDEs):
  - Euler–Maruyama method — generalization of the Euler method for SDEs
  - Milstein method — a method with strong order one
  - Runge–Kutta method (SDE) — generalization of the family of Runge–Kutta methods for SDEs
- Methods for solving integral equations:
  - Nyström method — replaces the integral with a quadrature rule
- Analysis:
  - Truncation error (numerical integration) — local and global truncation errors, and their relationships
    - Lady Windermere's Fan (mathematics) — telescopic identity relating local and global truncation errors
- Stiff equation — roughly, an ODE for which unstable methods need a very short step size, but stable methods do not
  - L-stability — method is A-stable and stability function vanishes at infinity
- Adaptive stepsize — automatically changing the step size when that seems advantageous
- Parareal -- a parallel-in-time integration algorithm

== Numerical methods for partial differential equations ==
Numerical partial differential equations — the numerical solution of partial differential equations (PDEs)

=== Finite difference methods ===
Finite difference method — based on approximating differential operators with difference operators

- Finite difference — the discrete analogue of a differential operator
  - Finite difference coefficient — table of coefficients of finite-difference approximations to derivatives
  - Discrete Laplace operator — finite-difference approximation of the Laplace operator
    - Eigenvalues and eigenvectors of the second derivative — includes eigenvalues of discrete Laplace operator
    - Kronecker sum of discrete Laplacians — used for Laplace operator in multiple dimensions
  - Discrete Poisson equation — discrete analogue of the Poisson equation using the discrete Laplace operator
- Stencil (numerical analysis) — the geometric arrangements of grid points affected by a basic step of the algorithm
  - Compact stencil — stencil which only uses a few grid points, usually only the immediate and diagonal neighbours
    - Higher-order compact finite difference scheme
  - Non-compact stencil — any stencil that is not compact
  - Five-point stencil — two-dimensional stencil consisting of a point and its four immediate neighbours on a rectangular grid
- Finite difference methods for heat equation and related PDEs:
  - FTCS scheme (forward-time central-space) — first-order explicit
  - Crank–Nicolson method — second-order implicit
- Finite difference methods for hyperbolic PDEs like the wave equation:
  - Lax–Friedrichs method — first-order explicit
  - Lax–Wendroff method — second-order explicit
  - MacCormack method — second-order explicit
  - Upwind scheme
    - Upwind differencing scheme for convection — first-order scheme for convection–diffusion problems
  - Lax–Wendroff theorem — conservative scheme for hyperbolic system of conservation laws converges to the weak solution
- Alternating direction implicit method (ADI) — update using the flow in x-direction and then using flow in y-direction
- Nonstandard finite difference scheme
- Specific applications:
  - Finite difference methods for option pricing
  - Finite-difference time-domain method — a finite-difference method for electrodynamics

=== Finite element methods, gradient discretisation methods ===
Finite element method — based on a discretization of the space of solutions gradient discretisation method — based on both the discretization of the solution and of its gradient

- Finite element method in structural mechanics — a physical approach to finite element methods
- Galerkin method — a finite element method in which the residual is orthogonal to the finite element space
  - Discontinuous Galerkin method — a Galerkin method in which the approximate solution is not continuous
- Rayleigh–Ritz method — a finite element method based on variational principles
- Spectral element method — high-order finite element methods
- hp-FEM — variant in which both the size and the order of the elements are automatically adapted
- Examples of finite elements:
  - Bilinear quadrilateral element — also known as the Q4 element
  - Constant strain triangle element (CST) — also known as the T3 element
  - Quadratic quadrilateral element — also known as the Q8 element
  - Barsoum elements
- Direct stiffness method — a particular implementation of the finite element method, often used in structural analysis
- Trefftz method
- Finite element updating
- Extended finite element method — puts functions tailored to the problem in the approximation space
- Functionally graded elements — elements for describing functionally graded materials
- Superelement — particular grouping of finite elements, employed as a single element
- Interval finite element method — combination of finite elements with interval arithmetic
- Discrete exterior calculus — discrete form of the exterior calculus of differential geometry
- Modal analysis using FEM — solution of eigenvalue problems to find natural vibrations
- Céa's lemma — solution in the finite-element space is an almost best approximation in that space of the true solution
- Patch test (finite elements) — simple test for the quality of a finite element
- MAFELAP (MAthematics of Finite ELements and APplications) — international conference held at Brunel University
- NAFEMS — not-for-profit organisation that sets and maintains standards in computer-aided engineering analysis
- Multiphase topology optimisation — technique based on finite elements for determining optimal composition of a mixture
- Interval finite element
- Applied element method — for simulation of cracks and structural collapse
- Wood–Armer method — structural analysis method based on finite elements used to design reinforcement for concrete slabs
- Isogeometric analysis — integrates finite elements into conventional NURBS-based CAD design tools
- Loubignac iteration
- Stiffness matrix — finite-dimensional analogue of differential operator
- Combination with meshfree methods:
  - Weakened weak form — form of a PDE that is weaker than the standard weak form
  - G space — functional space used in formulating the weakened weak form
  - Smoothed finite element method
- Variational multiscale method
- List of finite element software packages

=== Other methods ===
- Spectral method — based on the Fourier transformation
  - Pseudo-spectral method
- Method of lines — reduces the PDE to a large system of ordinary differential equations
- Boundary element method (BEM) — based on transforming the PDE to an integral equation on the boundary of the domain
  - Interval boundary element method — a version using interval arithmetics
- Analytic element method — similar to the boundary element method, but the integral equation is evaluated analytically
- Finite volume method — based on dividing the domain in many small domains; popular in computational fluid dynamics
  - Godunov's scheme — first-order conservative scheme for fluid flow, based on piecewise constant approximation
  - MUSCL scheme — second-order variant of Godunov's scheme
  - AUSM — advection upstream splitting method
  - Flux limiter — limits spatial derivatives (fluxes) in order to avoid spurious oscillations
  - Riemann solver — a solver for Riemann problems (a conservation law with piecewise constant data)
  - Properties of discretization schemes — finite volume methods can be conservative, bounded, etc.
- Discrete element method — a method in which the elements can move freely relative to each other
  - Extended discrete element method — adds properties such as strain to each particle
  - Movable cellular automaton — combination of cellular automata with discrete elements
- Meshfree methods — does not use a mesh, but uses a particle view of the field
  - Discrete least squares meshless method — based on minimization of weighted summation of the squared residual
  - Diffuse element method
  - Finite pointset method — represent continuum by a point cloud
  - Moving Particle Semi-implicit Method
  - Method of fundamental solutions (MFS) — represents solution as linear combination of fundamental solutions
  - Variants of MFS with source points on the physical boundary:
    - Boundary knot method (BKM)
    - Boundary particle method (BPM)
    - Regularized meshless method (RMM)
    - Singular boundary method (SBM)
- Methods designed for problems from electromagnetics:
  - Finite-difference time-domain method — a finite-difference method
  - Rigorous coupled-wave analysis — semi-analytical Fourier-space method based on Floquet's theorem
  - Transmission-line matrix method (TLM) — based on analogy between electromagnetic field and mesh of transmission lines
  - Uniform theory of diffraction — specifically designed for scattering problems
- Particle-in-cell — used especially in fluid dynamics
  - Multiphase particle-in-cell method — considers solid particles as both numerical particles and fluid
- High-resolution scheme
- Shock capturing method
- Vorticity confinement — for vortex-dominated flows in fluid dynamics, similar to shock capturing
- Split-step method
- Fast marching method
- Orthogonal collocation
- Lattice Boltzmann methods — for the solution of the Navier-Stokes equations
- Roe solver — for the solution of the Euler equation
- Relaxation (iterative method) — a method for solving elliptic PDEs by converting them to evolution equations
- Broad classes of methods:
  - Mimetic methods — methods that respect in some sense the structure of the original problem
  - Multiphysics — models consisting of various submodels with different physics
  - Immersed boundary method — for simulating elastic structures immersed within fluids
- Multisymplectic integrator — extension of symplectic integrators, which are for ODEs
- Stretched grid method — for problems solution that can be related to an elastic grid behavior.

=== Techniques for improving these methods ===
- Multigrid method — uses a hierarchy of nested meshes to speed up the methods
- Domain decomposition methods — divides the domain in a few subdomains and solves the PDE on these subdomains
  - Additive Schwarz method
  - Abstract additive Schwarz method — abstract version of additive Schwarz without reference to geometric information
  - Balancing domain decomposition method (BDD) — preconditioner for symmetric positive definite matrices
  - Balancing domain decomposition by constraints (BDDC) — further development of BDD
  - Finite element tearing and interconnect (FETI)
  - FETI-DP — further development of FETI
  - Fictitious domain method — preconditioner constructed with a structured mesh on a fictitious domain of simple shape
  - Mortar methods — meshes on subdomain do not mesh
  - Neumann–Dirichlet method — combines Neumann problem on one subdomain with Dirichlet problem on other subdomain
  - Neumann–Neumann methods — domain decomposition methods that use Neumann problems on the subdomains
  - Poincaré–Steklov operator — maps tangential electric field onto the equivalent electric current
  - Schur complement method — early and basic method on subdomains that do not overlap
  - Schwarz alternating method — early and basic method on subdomains that overlap
- Coarse space — variant of the problem which uses a discretization with fewer degrees of freedom
- Adaptive mesh refinement — uses the computed solution to refine the mesh only where necessary
- Fast multipole method — hierarchical method for evaluating particle-particle interactions
- Perfectly matched layer — artificial absorbing layer for wave equations, used to implement absorbing boundary conditions

=== Grids and meshes ===
- Grid classification / Types of mesh:
  - Polygon mesh — consists of polygons in 2D or 3D
  - Triangle mesh — consists of triangles in 2D or 3D
    - Triangulation (geometry) — subdivision of given region in triangles, or higher-dimensional analogue
    - Nonobtuse mesh — mesh in which all angles are less than or equal to 90°
    - Point-set triangulation — triangle mesh such that given set of point are all a vertex of a triangle
    - Polygon triangulation — triangle mesh inside a polygon
    - Delaunay triangulation — triangulation such that no vertex is inside the circumcentre of a triangle
    - Constrained Delaunay triangulation — generalization of the Delaunay triangulation that forces certain required segments into the triangulation
    - Pitteway triangulation — for any point, triangle containing it has nearest neighbour of the point as a vertex
    - Minimum-weight triangulation — triangulation of minimum total edge length
    - Kinetic triangulation — a triangulation that moves over time
    - Triangulated irregular network
    - Quasi-triangulation — subdivision into simplices, where vertices are not points but arbitrary sloped line segments
  - Volume mesh — consists of three-dimensional shapes
  - Regular grid — consists of congruent parallelograms, or higher-dimensional analogue
  - Unstructured grid
  - Geodesic grid — isotropic grid on a sphere
- Mesh generation
  - Image-based meshing — automatic procedure of generating meshes from 3D image data
  - Marching cubes — extracts a polygon mesh from a scalar field
  - Parallel mesh generation
  - Ruppert's algorithm — creates quality Delauney triangularization from piecewise linear data
- Subdivisions:
- Apollonian network — undirected graph formed by recursively subdividing a triangle
- Barycentric subdivision — standard way of dividing arbitrary convex polygons into triangles, or the higher-dimensional analogue
- Improving an existing mesh:
  - Chew's second algorithm — improves Delauney triangularization by refining poor-quality triangles
  - Laplacian smoothing — improves polynomial meshes by moving the vertices
- Jump-and-Walk algorithm — for finding triangle in a mesh containing a given point
- Spatial twist continuum — dual representation of a mesh consisting of hexahedra
- Pseudotriangle — simply connected region between any three mutually tangent convex sets
- Simplicial complex — all vertices, line segments, triangles, tetrahedra, ..., making up a mesh

=== Analysis ===
- Lax equivalence theorem — a consistent method is convergent if and only if it is stable
- Courant–Friedrichs–Lewy condition — stability condition for hyperbolic PDEs
- Von Neumann stability analysis — all Fourier components of the error should be stable
- Numerical diffusion — diffusion introduced by the numerical method, above to that which is naturally present
  - False diffusion
- Numerical dispersion
- Numerical resistivity — the same, with resistivity instead of diffusion
- Weak formulation — a functional-analytic reformulation of the PDE necessary for some methods
- Total variation diminishing — property of schemes that do not introduce spurious oscillations
- Godunov's theorem — linear monotone schemes can only be of first order
- Motz's problem — benchmark problem for singularity problems

== Monte Carlo method ==
- Variants of the Monte Carlo method:
  - Direct simulation Monte Carlo
  - Quasi-Monte Carlo method
  - Markov chain Monte Carlo
    - Metropolis–Hastings algorithm
      - Multiple-try Metropolis — modification which allows larger step sizes
      - Wang and Landau algorithm — extension of Metropolis Monte Carlo
      - Equation of State Calculations by Fast Computing Machines — 1953 article proposing the Metropolis Monte Carlo algorithm
      - Multicanonical ensemble — sampling technique that uses Metropolis–Hastings to compute integrals
    - Gibbs sampling
    - Coupling from the past
    - Reversible-jump Markov chain Monte Carlo
  - Dynamic Monte Carlo method
    - Kinetic Monte Carlo
    - Gillespie algorithm
  - Particle filter
    - Auxiliary particle filter
  - Reverse Monte Carlo
  - Demon algorithm
- Pseudo-random number sampling
  - Inverse transform sampling — general and straightforward method but computationally expensive
  - Rejection sampling — sample from a simpler distribution but reject some of the samples
    - Ziggurat algorithm — uses a pre-computed table covering the probability distribution with rectangular segments
  - For sampling from a normal distribution:
    - Box–Muller transform
    - Marsaglia polar method
  - Convolution random number generator — generates a random variable as a sum of other random variables
  - Indexed search
- Variance reduction techniques:
  - Antithetic variates
  - Control variates
  - Importance sampling
  - Stratified sampling
  - VEGAS algorithm
- Low-discrepancy sequence
  - Constructions of low-discrepancy sequences
- Event generator
- Parallel tempering
- Umbrella sampling — improves sampling in physical systems with significant energy barriers
- Hybrid Monte Carlo
- Ensemble Kalman filter — recursive filter suitable for problems with a large number of variables
- Transition path sampling
- Walk-on-spheres method — to generate exit-points of Brownian motion from bounded domains
- Applications:
  - Ensemble forecasting — produce multiple numerical predictions from slightly initial conditions or parameters
  - Bond fluctuation model — for simulating the conformation and dynamics of polymer systems
  - Iterated filtering
  - Metropolis light transport
  - Monte Carlo localization — estimates the position and orientation of a robot
  - Monte Carlo methods for electron transport
  - Monte Carlo method for photon transport
  - Monte Carlo methods in finance
    - Monte Carlo methods for option pricing
    - Quasi-Monte Carlo methods in finance
  - Monte Carlo molecular modeling
    - Path integral molecular dynamics — incorporates Feynman path integrals
  - Quantum Monte Carlo
    - Diffusion Monte Carlo — uses a Green function to solve the Schrödinger equation
    - Gaussian quantum Monte Carlo
    - Path integral Monte Carlo
    - Reptation Monte Carlo
    - Variational Monte Carlo
  - Methods for simulating the Ising model:
    - Swendsen–Wang algorithm — entire sample is divided into equal-spin clusters
    - Wolff algorithm — improvement of the Swendsen–Wang algorithm
    - Metropolis–Hastings algorithm
  - Auxiliary field Monte Carlo — computes averages of operators in many-body quantum mechanical problems
  - Cross-entropy method — for multi-extremal optimization and importance sampling
- Also see the list of statistics topics

== Applications ==
- Computational physics
  - Computational electromagnetics
  - Computational fluid dynamics (CFD)
    - Numerical methods in fluid mechanics
    - Large eddy simulation
    - Smoothed-particle hydrodynamics
    - Aeroacoustic analogy — used in numerical aeroacoustics to reduce sound sources to simple emitter types
    - Stochastic Eulerian Lagrangian method — uses Eulerian description for fluids and Lagrangian for structures
    - Explicit algebraic stress model
  - Computational magnetohydrodynamics (CMHD) — studies electrically conducting fluids
  - Climate model
  - Numerical weather prediction
    - Geodesic grid
  - Celestial mechanics
    - Numerical model of the Solar System
  - Quantum jump method — used for simulating open quantum systems, operates on wave function
  - Dynamic design analysis method (DDAM) — for evaluating effect of underwater explosions on equipment
- Computational chemistry
  - Cell lists
  - Coupled cluster
  - Density functional theory
  - DIIS — direct inversion in (or of) the iterative subspace
- Computational sociology
- Computational statistics

== Software ==
For a large list of software, see the list of numerical-analysis software.

== Journals ==
- Acta Numerica
- Mathematics of Computation (published by the American Mathematical Society)
- Journal of Computational and Applied Mathematics
- BIT Numerical Mathematics
- Numerische Mathematik
- Journals from the Society for Industrial and Applied Mathematics
  - SIAM Journal on Numerical Analysis
  - SIAM Journal on Scientific Computing

== Researchers ==
- Cleve Moler
- Gene H. Golub
- James H. Wilkinson
- Margaret H. Wright
- Nicholas J. Higham
- Nick Trefethen
- Peter Lax
- Richard S. Varga
- Ulrich W. Kulisch
- Vladik Kreinovich
- Chi-Wang Shu
