= Order of approximation =

Expressions for approximation accuracy

In science, engineering, and other quantitative disciplines, order of approximation refers to formal or informal expressions for how accurate an approximation is in terms of the number of parameters used to construct the approximation. This article focuses on the approximation of smooth real-valued functions of one variable – the notion extends to functions between other spaces, such as between Euclidean spaces of varying dimension.

== Formal expressions ==
In science and engineering, it is common to approximate a function by applying a series expansion such as a Taylor series, and then discarding terms with higher powers of the variable. The order of the approximation is the highest power term that is kept. For example, one can refer to a zeroth-order approximation, a first-order approximation, a second-order approximation, etc. Variations such as zero-order approximation and order-zero approximation are also seen.

In the case of a smooth function, the nth-order approximation is a polynomial of degree n, which is obtained by truncating the Taylor series to this degree. Truncating the series affects accuracy. In most cases the accuracy of the approximation improves as the order increases, but the order does not directly indicate the percent error of the approximation. See Taylor's theorem for more on this.

For example, in the Taylor expansion of the exponential function,
$$e^x=\underbrace{1}_{0^\text{th}}+\underbrace{x}_{1^\text{st}}+\underbrace{\frac{x^2}{2!}}_{2^\text{nd}}+\underbrace{\frac{x^3}{3!}}_{3^\text{rd}} + \underbrace{\frac{x^4}{4!}}_{4^\text{th}} + \ldots\;,$$
the zeroth-order term is $1;$ the first-order term is $x,$ second-order is $x^2/2,$ and so forth. If $|x|<1,$ each higher order term is smaller than the previous. If $|x| \ll 1,\,$ then the first-order approximation,
$$e^x\approx 1+x,$$
is often sufficient. But at $x=1,$ the first-order term, $x,$ is not smaller than the zeroth-order term, $1.$ And at $x=2,$ even the second-order term, $2^3/3!=4/3,\,$ is greater than the zeroth-order term.

For $|x|<1,\,$ the first few orders of approximation of this function are:

Zeroth-order
$$e^x\approx 1$$
First-order
$$e^x\approx 1+x$$
Second-order
$$e^x\approx 1+x+\frac{x^2}{2}$$
Third-order
$$e^x\approx 1+x+\frac{x^2}{2}+\frac{x^3}{6}$$
Fourth-order
$$e^x\approx 1+x+\frac{x^2}{2}+\frac{x^3}{6}+\frac{x^4}{24}$$

== Colloquial usage ==
These terms are also used colloquially by scientists and engineers to indicate that a treatment is approximate or to describe phenomena that can be neglected as not significant. For example, one may casually describe a mathematical description of a physical system as a first-order approximation even when no series expansion has been used, or one may describe a mechanism being ignored as a high-order effect. In this usage, the ordinality of the approximation is not exact, but is used to emphasize the insignificance of the effect. For example, one might say "Of course the rotation of the Earth affects our experiment, but it's such a high-order effect that we wouldn't be able to measure it." or "At these velocities, relativity is a fourth-order effect that we only worry about at the annual calibration."

== See also ==
- Linearization
- Perturbation theory
- Chapman–Enskog method
- Big O notation
- Order of accuracy
