= Quadratic quadrilateral element =

The quadratic quadrilateral element, also known as the Q8 element, is a type of element used in finite element analysis which is used to approximate in a 2D domain the exact solution to a given differential equation. It is a two-dimensional finite element with both local and global coordinates. This element can be used for plane stress or plane strain problems in elasticity. The quadratic quadrilateral element has modulus of elasticity E, Poisson’s ratio v, and thickness t.
