= Bilinear program =

In mathematics, a bilinear program is a nonlinear optimization problem whose objective or constraint functions are bilinear. An example is the pooling problem.
