= Kinetic triangulation =

A kinetic triangulation data structure is a kinetic data structure that maintains a triangulation of a set of moving points. Maintaining a kinetic triangulation is important for applications that involve motion planning, such as video games, virtual reality, dynamic simulations and robotics.

== Choosing a triangulation scheme ==
The efficiency of a kinetic data structure is defined based on the ratio of the number of internal events to external events, thus good runtime bounds can sometimes be obtained by choosing to use a triangulation scheme that generates a small number of external events. For simple affine motion of the points, the number of discrete changes to the convex hull is estimated by $\Omega(n^2)$, thus the number of changes to any triangulation is also lower bounded by $\Omega(n^2)$. Finding any triangulation scheme that has a near-quadratic bound on the number of discrete changes is an important open problem.

=== Delaunay triangulation ===
The Delaunay triangulation seems like a natural candidate, but a tight worst-case analysis of the number of discrete changes that will occur to the Delaunay triangulation (external events) was considered an open problem until 2015; it has now been bounded to be between $\Omega(n^2)$ and $O(n^{2+\epsilon})$.

There is a kinetic data structure that efficiently maintains the Delaunay triangulation of a set of moving points, in which the ratio of the total number of events to the number of external events is $O(1)$.

=== Other triangulations ===
Kaplan et al. developed a randomized triangulation scheme that experiences an expected number of $O(n^2 \beta_{s+2}(n) \log^2 n)$ external events, where $s$ is the maximum number of times each triple of points can become collinear, $\beta_{s+2}(q) = \frac{\lambda_{s+2}(q)}{q}$, and $\lambda_{s+2}(q)$ is the maximum length of a Davenport-Schinzel sequence of order s + 2 on n symbols.

=== Pseudo-triangulations ===
There is a kinetic data structure (due to Agarwal et al.) which maintains a pseudo-triangulation in $O(n^22^{\sqrt{\log n\log\log n}})$ events total. All events are external and require $O(\lg n)$ time to process.
