= Space allocation problem =

Architectural planning problem of assigning rooms and spaces within a building

In architecture and space planning, the space allocation problem (SAP) is the problem of assigning rooms and other spaces to positions, sizes and shapes within a building. The resulting layout must usually satisfy requirements concerning room area, dimensions, adjacency, access, circulation and the location of doors, windows and building services.

The problem is computationally difficult because even a small number of rooms can be arranged in many different ways. Space-allocation systems are therefore generally used to generate and compare possible layouts rather than to produce a single universally correct design.

The subject overlaps with automated floor plan generation and with facility layout planning in industrial engineering, which is commonly formulated as a quadratic assignment problem. Facility-layout research often concentrates on the placement of departments or equipment, while architectural space allocation may also consider circulation, privacy, daylight, structure and building regulations.

== Description ==
A space-allocation problem normally begins with a list of required spaces, such as bedrooms, offices, corridors or service rooms. Each space may have a target area, minimum width, preferred orientation or required relationship with other spaces.

Requirements are commonly divided into two types:

- Topological requirements describe relationships between spaces, such as whether two rooms should be adjacent, separated or connected by a corridor.
- Geometric requirements describe their physical form, including position, dimensions, orientation and shape.

Some requirements are treated as fixed constraints, while others are preferences. For example, a bedroom may be required to have access to a corridor but only preferred to face a particular direction.

Layouts may be evaluated according to several objectives. These can include reducing travel distance, satisfying adjacency requests, limiting unused space, improving daylight or reducing expected energy use. Since these objectives can conflict, a system may produce several alternatives for comparison rather than one optimum plan.

== Methods ==
Early space-allocation research used mathematical ordering and optimization methods. One-dimensional models arranged rooms along a corridor while attempting to minimize the distance travelled between them. Other early research examined the computer generation of rectangular floor plans.

Later approaches used graph theory, rule-based systems, mathematical programming and evolutionary computation. Evolutionary methods generate a population of layouts and gradually modify them according to measures of quality and constraint satisfaction. They have been applied to both single-storey and multi-storey buildings.

From the late 2010s, researchers made increasing use of machine learning to generate floor plans from collections of existing designs. These systems may learn common room arrangements or generate layouts from an exterior boundary, a list of rooms or a graph of required relationships.

Reported techniques include graph neural networks, generative adversarial networks and diffusion models. Machine-generated layouts often require further checking or editing to ensure that circulation, dimensions and construction requirements are valid.

== Variants ==
The one-dimensional space allocation problem concerns the ordering of spaces along a line, such as a row of rooms beside a corridor. Its objective is often to reduce the total distance travelled between frequently connected rooms.

The multi-storey space allocation problem also determines which floor each space should occupy. It may include stairs, lifts, shafts and vertical relationships between rooms.

In performance-based space allocation, layouts are evaluated using measures such as daylight, energy use, occupant movement or construction cost. These calculations may be combined with geometric and adjacency requirements.

== Limitations ==
Many computational models simplify rooms as rectangles and assume a fixed building boundary. They may omit detailed structure, plumbing, ventilation, accessibility or fire-safety requirements. A layout that is mathematically valid may therefore not be suitable for construction.

Machine-learning systems also depend on their training data. Models trained mainly on residential plans may perform poorly on hospitals, schools or other building types. Existing numerical measures cannot fully assess qualities such as comfort, privacy, cultural suitability or architectural character. For these reasons, space-allocation systems are generally regarded as design-support tools, with architects selecting, reviewing and modifying the generated alternatives.

== See also ==
- Computer-aided architectural design
- Generative design
- Multi-objective optimization
- Quadratic assignment problem
- Space syntax
