= Basic solution (linear programming) =

In linear programming, a discipline within applied mathematics, a basic solution is any solution of a linear programming problem satisfying certain specified technical conditions.

For a polyhedron $P$ and a vector $\mathbf{x}^* \in \mathbb{R}^n$, $\mathbf{x}^*$ is a basic solution if:

1. All the equality constraints defining $P$ are active at $\mathbf{x}^*$
2. Of all the constraints that are active at that vector, at least $n$ of them must be linearly independent. Note that this also means that at least $n$ constraints must be active at that vector.

A constraint is active for a particular solution $\mathbf{x}$ if it is satisfied at equality for that solution.

A basic solution that satisfies all the constraints defining $P$ (or, in other words, one that lies within $P$) is called a basic feasible solution.
