= Wood–Armer method =

Structural analysis method

The Wood–Armer method is a structural analysis method based on finite element analysis used to design the reinforcement for concrete slabs. This method provides simple equations to design a concrete slab based on the output from a finite element analysis software.

The method was described by engineers Randal Herbert Wood and Graham S. T. Armer in 1968.
