= Generalized semi-infinite programming =

In mathematics, a semi-infinite programming (SIP) problem is an optimization problem with a finite number of variables and an infinite number of constraints. The constraints are typically parameterized. In a generalized semi-infinite programming (GSIP) problem, the feasible set of the parameters depends on the variables.

== Mathematical formulation of the problem ==
The problem can be stated simply as:

$$\min\limits_{x \in X}\;\; f(x)$$

$$\mbox{subject to: }\$$

$$g(x,y) \le 0, \;\;  \forall y \in Y(x)$$

where

$$f: R^n \to R$$
$$g: R^n \times R^m \to R$$
$$X \subseteq R^n$$
$$Y \subseteq R^m.$$

In the special case that the set :$Y(x)$ is nonempty for all $x \in X$ GSIP can be cast as bilevel programs (Multilevel programming).

== See also ==
- optimization
- Semi-Infinite Programming (SIP)
