= Motz's problem =

Mathematical benchmark

In mathematics, Motz's problem is a problem which is widely employed as a benchmark for singularity problems to compare the effectiveness of numerical methods. The problem was first presented in 1947 by H. Motz in the paper "The treatment of singularities of partial differential equations by relaxation methods".
