= Bilinear quadrilateral element =

The bilinear quadrilateral element, also known as the Q4 element, is a type of element used in finite element analysis which is used to approximate in a 2D domain the exact solution to a given differential equation.

The element consists of a combination of two sets of Lagrange polynomials, each one used to define the variation of a field in each orthogonal direction of the local referential.
