= Semi-infinite programming =

Problem in optimization theory

In optimization theory, semi-infinite programming (SIP) is an optimization problem with a finite number of variables and an infinite number of constraints, or an infinite number of variables and a finite number of constraints. In the former case the constraints are typically parameterized.

== Mathematical formulation of the problem ==
The problem can be stated simply as:

$$\min_{x \in X}\;\; f(x)$$

$$\text{subject to: }$$

$$g(x,y) \le 0, \;\;  \forall y \in Y$$

where

$$f: R^n \to R$$
$$g: R^n \times R^m \to R$$
$$X \subseteq R^n$$
$$Y \subseteq R^m.$$

SIP can be seen as a special case of bilevel programs in which the lower-level variables do not participate in the objective function.

== Methods for solving the problem ==
In the meantime, see external links below for a complete tutorial.

== Examples ==
In the meantime, see external links below for a complete tutorial.

== See also ==
- Optimization
- Generalized semi-infinite programming (GSIP)
