= Vector field reconstruction =

Vector field reconstruction is a method of creating a vector field from experimental or computer-generated data, usually with the goal of finding a differential equation model of the system.

== Definition ==
A differential equation model is one that describes the value of dependent variables as they evolve in time or space by giving equations involving those variables and their derivatives with respect to some independent variables, usually time and/or space. An ordinary differential equation is one in which the system's dependent variables are functions of only one independent variable. Many physical, chemical, biological, and electrical systems are well described by ordinary differential equations. Frequently one may assume a system is governed by differential equations, but does not have exact knowledge of the influence of various factors on the state of the system. For instance, one may have an electrical circuit that in theory is described by a system of ordinary differential equations, but due to the tolerance of resistors, variations of the supply voltage, or interference from outside influences, they do not know the exact parameters of the system. For some systems, especially those that support chaos, a small change in parameter values can cause a large change in the behaviour of the system, so an accurate model is extremely important. Therefore, it may be necessary to construct more exact differential equations by building them up based on the actual system performance rather than a theoretical model. Ideally, one would measure all the dynamical variables involved over an extended period of time, using many different initial conditions, then build or fine-tune a differential equation model based on these measurements.

In some cases, one may not know enough about the processes involved in a system to even formulate a model. In other cases, they may have access to only one dynamical variable for their measurements, i.e., if they have a scalar time series. If one only has a scalar time series, they need to use the method of time delay embedding or derivative coordinates to get a large enough set of dynamical variables to describe the system.

In a nutshell, once a set of measurements of the system state over some period of time has been acquired, one then finds the derivatives of these measurements, which forms a local vector field. They can then determine a global vector field consistent with this local field. This is usually done by a least squares fit to the derivative data.

== Formulation ==
In the best possible case, one has data streams of measurements of all the system variables, equally spaced in time, say

s_{1}(t), s_{2}(t), ... , s_{k}(t)

for

t = t_{1}, t_{2},..., t_{n},

beginning at several different initial conditions. Then the task of finding a vector field, and thus a differential equation model consists of fitting functions, for instance, a cubic spline, to the data to obtain a set of continuous-time functions

x_{1}(t), x_{2}(t), ... , x_{k}(t),

computing time derivatives dx_{1}/dt, dx_{2}/dt,...,dx_{k}/dt of the functions, then making the least squares fit using some sort of orthogonal basis functions (orthogonal polynomials, radial basis functions, etc.) to each component of the tangent vectors to find a global vector field. A differential equation then can be read off the global vector field.

There are various methods of creating the basis functions for the least squares fit. The most common method is the Gram–Schmidt process. Which creates a set of orthogonal basis vectors, which can then easily be normalized. This method begins by first selecting any standard basis β={v_{1}, v_{2},...,v_{n}}. Next, set the first vector v_{1}=u_{1}. Then, set u_{2}=v_{2}-proj_{u_{1}}v_{2}. This process is repeated for k vectors, with the final vector being u_{k}= v_{k}-Σ_{(j=1)}^{(k-1)}proj_{u_{k}}v_{k}. This then creates a set of orthogonal standard basis vectors.

The reason for using a standard orthogonal basis rather than a standard basis arises from the creation of the least squares fitting done next. Creating a least-squares fit begins by assuming some function, in the case of the reconstruction of an n^{th} degree polynomial, and fitting the curve to the data using constants. The accuracy of the fit can be increased by increasing the degree of the polynomial being used to fit the data. If a set of non-orthogonal standard basis functions was used, it becomes necessary to recalculate the constant coefficients of the function describing the fit. However, by using the orthogonal set of basis functions, it is not necessary to recalculate the constant coefficients.

== Applications ==
Vector field reconstruction has several applications, and many different approaches. Some mathematicians have not only used radial basis functions and polynomials to reconstruct a vector field, but they have also used Lyapunov exponents and singular value decomposition. Gouesbet and Letellier used a multivariate polynomial approximation and least squares to reconstruct their vector field. This method was applied to the Rössler system, and the Lorenz system, as well as thermal lens oscillations.

The Rossler system, Lorenz system, and Thermal lens oscillation follow the differential equations in the standard system as

X'=Y, Y'=Z and Z'=F(X,Y,Z)

where F(X,Y,Z) is known as the standard function.

== Implementation issues ==
In some situations the model is not very efficient and difficulties can arise if the model has a large number of coefficients and demonstrates a divergent solution. For example, nonautonomous differential equations give the previously described results. In this case, the modification of the standard approach in application gives a better way of further development of global vector reconstruction.

Usually, the system being modelled in this way is a chaotic dynamical system, because chaotic systems explore a large part of the phase space and the estimate of the global dynamics based on the local dynamics will be better than with a system exploring only a small part of the space.

Frequently, one has only a single scalar time series measurement from a system known to have more than one degree of freedom. The time series may not even be from a system variable, but may be instead of a function of all the variables, such as temperature in a stirred tank reactor using several chemical species. In this case, one must use the technique of delay coordinate embedding, where a state vector consisting of the data at time t and several delayed versions of the data is constructed.

A comprehensive review of the topic is available from

A global mathematical model along with numerical simulations with applications to wind velocity fields using is given in.
