= Linear programming decoding =

Decoding method

In information theory and coding theory, linear programming decoding (LP decoding) is a decoding method which uses concepts from linear programming (LP) theory to solve decoding problems. This approach was first used by Jon Feldman et al. They showed how the LP can be used to decode block codes.

The basic idea behind LP decoding is to first represent the maximum likelihood decoding of a linear code as an integer linear program, and then relax the integrality constraints on the variables into linear inequalities.
