= Mean field annealing =

Mean field annealing is a deterministic approximation to the simulated annealing technique of solving optimization problems. This method uses mean field theory and is based on Peierls' inequality.
