= PDE surface =

PDE surfaces are used in geometric modelling and computer graphics for creating smooth surfaces conforming to a given boundary configuration. PDE surfaces use partial differential equations to generate a surface which usually satisfy a mathematical boundary value problem.

PDE surfaces were first introduced into the area of geometric modelling and computer graphics by two British mathematicians, Malcolm Bloor and Michael Wilson.

== Technical details ==
The PDE method involves generating a surface for some boundary by means of solving an elliptic partial differential equation of the form

$$\left( \frac{\partial ^{2}}{ \partial
u^{2}} + a^{2}\frac {\partial^{2}}{\partial v^{2}} \right)^{2}
X(u,v) = 0.$$

Here $X(u,v)$ is a function parameterised by the two parameters $u$ and $v$ such that $X(u,v) = (x(u,v), y(u,v), z(u,v))$ where $x$, $y$ and $z$ are the usual cartesian coordinate space. The boundary conditions on the function $X(u,v)$ and its normal derivatives $\partial{X}/\partial{{n}}$ are imposed at the edges of the surface patch.

With the above formulation it is notable that the elliptic partial differential operator in the above PDE represents a smoothing process in which the value of the function at any point on the surface is, in some sense, a weighted average of the surrounding values. In this way, a surface is obtained as a smooth transition between the chosen set of boundary conditions. The parameter $a$ is a special design parameter which controls the relative smoothing of the surface in the $u$ and $v$ directions.

When $a=1$, the PDE is the biharmonic equation: $X_{uuuu} + 2X_{uuvv} + X_{vvvv}=0$. The biharmonic equation is the equation produced by applying the Euler–Lagrange equation to the simplified thin plate energy functional $X_{uu}^2 + 2X_{uv}^2 + X_{vv}^2$. So solving the PDE with $a=1$ is equivalent to minimizing the thin plate energy functional subject to the same boundary conditions.

== Applications ==
PDE surfaces can be used in many application areas. These include computer-aided design, interactive design, parametric design, computer animation, computer-aided physical analysis and design optimisation.

== Related publications ==
1. M.I.G. Bloor and M.J. Wilson, Generating Blend Surfaces using Partial Differential Equations, Computer Aided Design, 21(3), 165–171, (1989).
2. H. Ugail, M.I.G. Bloor, and M.J. Wilson, Techniques for Interactive Design Using the PDE Method, ACM Transactions on Graphics, 18(2), 195–212, (1999).
3. J. Huband, W. Li and R. Smith, An Explicit Representation of Bloor-Wilson PDE Surface Model by using Canonical Basis for Hermite Interpolation, Mathematical Engineering in Industry, 7(4), 421-33 (1999).
4. H. Du and H. Qin, Direct Manipulation and Interactive Sculpting of PDE surfaces, Computer Graphics Forum, 19(3), C261-C270, (2000).
5. H. Ugail, Spine Based Shape Parameterisations for PDE surfaces, Computing, 72, 195–204, (2004).
6. L. You, P. Comninos, J.J. Zhang, PDE Blending Surfaces with C2 Continuity, Computers and Graphics, 28(6), 895–906, (2004).
