= Trend surface analysis =

Mathematical technique used in environmental sciences

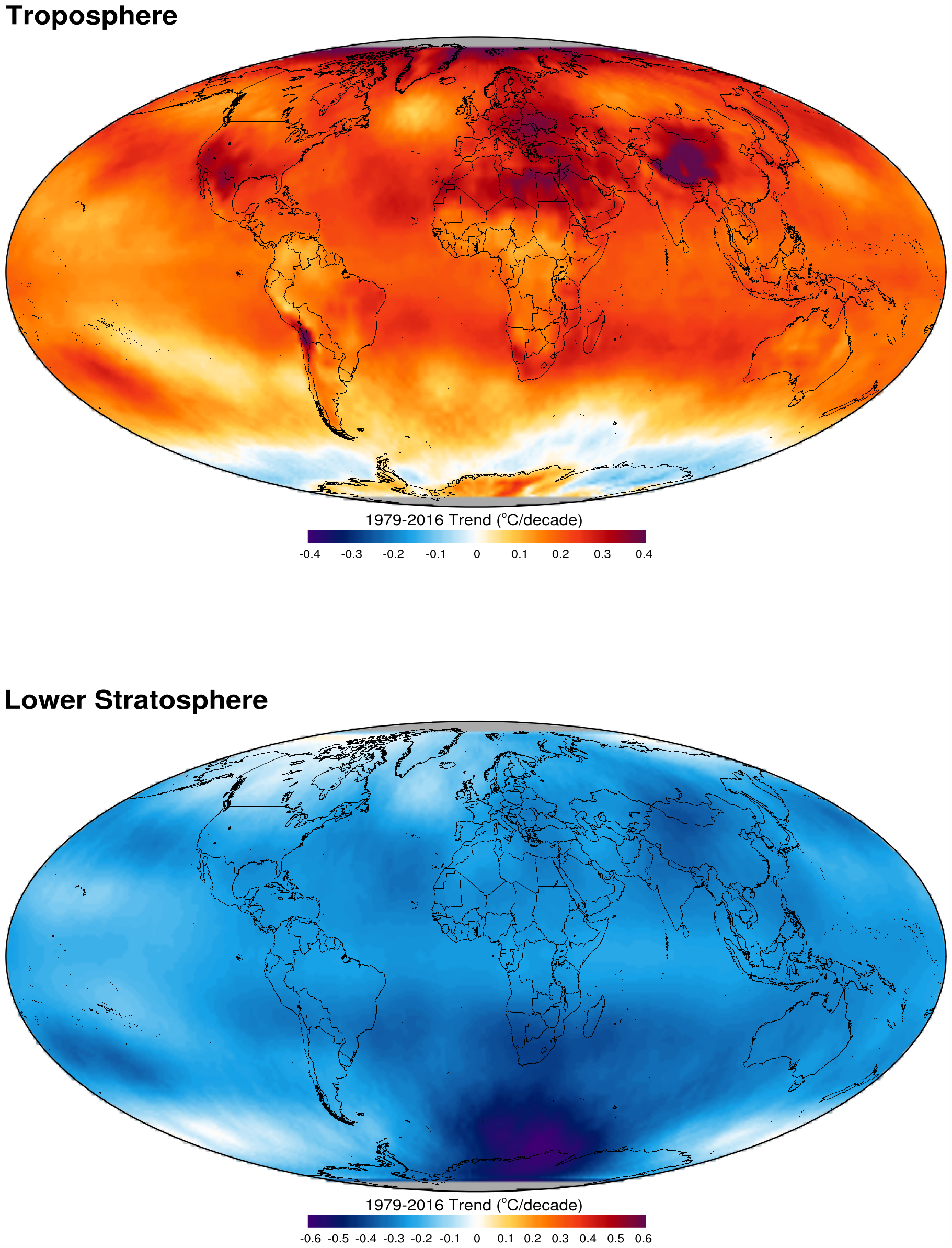
Worldwide temperature trend analysis

Trend surface analysis, also known as trend surface mapping, is a mathematical technique used in archaeology and environmental sciences such as geology and soil science. The method involves using low-order polynomials of spatial coordinates to estimate a regular grid of points from scattered observations such as archeological finds or soil survey results.
