= Order of accuracy =

Term in numerical analysis

In numerical analysis, order of accuracy quantifies the rate of convergence of a numerical approximation of a differential equation to the exact solution. Consider $u$, the exact solution to a differential equation in an appropriate normed space $(V,||\ ||)$. Consider a numerical approximation $u_h$, where $h$ is a parameter characterizing the approximation, such as the step size in a finite difference scheme or the diameter of the cells in a finite element method. The numerical solution $u_h$ is said to be $\mathbf{n}$th-order accurate if the error $E(h):= ||u-u_h||$ is proportional to the step-size $h$ to the $n$th power:

$$E(h) = ||u-u_h|| \leq Ch^n$$

where the constant $C$ is independent of $h$ and usually depends on the solution $u$. Using the big O notation an $n$th-order accurate numerical method is notated as

$$||u-u_h|| = O(h^n)$$

This definition is strictly dependent on the norm used in the space; the choice of such norm is fundamental to estimate the rate of convergence and, in general, all numerical errors correctly.

The size of the error of a first-order accurate approximation is directly proportional to $h$. Partial differential equations which vary over both time and space are said to be accurate to order $n$ in time and to order $m$ in space.
