= Kansa method =

Computational method for solving partial differential equations

The Kansa method (also known as the unsymmetric radial basis function collocation method) is a meshless numerical method for solving partial differential equations (PDEs) introduced by E. J. Kansa in the early 1990s. The method uses radial basis functions (RBFs) to approximate the solution in a strong-form collocation framework. The method is a domain-type numerical technique in the sense that the problem is discretized not only on the boundary to satisfy boundary conditions but also inside domain to satisfy governing equation.

== Formulation ==
Let $\Omega \subseteq\mathbb{R}^d$ be a $d$-dimensional physical domain and consider the following boundary value problem (BVP)

$$\begin{align}
Lu(x) & = f(x),\quad x\in \Omega, & & (1) \\[4pt]
u(x) & = g(x),\quad x\in\partial\Omega_D, & & (2) \\[4pt]
\frac{\partial u(x)}{\partial n} & = h(x),\quad x\in\partial\Omega_N, & & (3)
\end{align}$$

where $L$ represents a differential operator and $d$ is the dimensionality of the problem, $\partial \Omega_D,\, \partial \Omega_N$ denote the Dirichlet and Neumann boundaries, respectively, and $\partial \Omega_D \cup \partial \Omega_N =\partial \Omega$. The Kansa method approximates the desired function by a linear combination of the RBF in the form:

$$u(x)\approx u(x)^{*} = \sum_{i=1}^N \alpha_i\varphi (r_i),\qquad(4)$$

where $\alpha_i$ are the coefficients to be determined, $\varphi(r_i)$ denotes the RBF such as the multiquadric (MQ), and $r_i = \|x - x_i\|$, where the $x_i$ are the centres of the RBFs.

In order to guarantee the uniqueness of the solution, a polynomial term may be added as follows:

$$u(x)^{*} = \sum_{i=1}^N \alpha_i\varphi(r_i) + \sum_{k=1}^M \alpha_{k+N} \gamma_k(x),\qquad (5)$$

where $\gamma_k(x)$ is the polynomial. The RBF interpolation (4) and (5) are both often used in practice. Mathematicians prefer the latter for its rigorous and solid theoretical foundation, while engineering users often employ the former since it is easier and simpler and produces the sound results in the majority of cases. Substituting Eq. (4) or (5) into Eqs. (1–3) yields the resulting algebraic equation system:

$$\mathbf{A}\alpha = b,\qquad (6)$$

where

$$\mathbf{A} = \left(\begin{matrix} L(\varphi) & L(\gamma) \\[5pt] \varphi  & \gamma \\[8pt] \dfrac{\partial\varphi}{\partial n} & \dfrac{\partial\gamma}{\partial n}\\[8pt] \gamma &0 \end{matrix} \right),\quad \mathbf{b}=\left(\begin{matrix} f\\g\\h\\0 \end{matrix} \right),\quad \varphi = \varphi(x_i,x_j),\quad \gamma = \gamma_k(X_i). \qquad (7)$$

After expansion coefficients $\alpha_i$ are evaluated, the desired function can be calculated from Eq. (4) or (5).

== History and recent developments ==
Numerical solutions of PDEs are usually obtained through the finite difference method (FDM), the finite element method (FEM) or boundary element method (BEM). The FDM struggles with irregular domains because it typically requires a structured rectangular grid. Although the FEM can accommodate a more flexible framework, the meshing and remeshing are not trivial. The BEM is an alternative method in some engineering problems, such as inverse, unbounded domain, and thin-walled structure problems. However, its applications are largely limited by the availability of the fundamental solution of the governing equation.

In the recent several decades, “meshless” or “element-free” methods have attracted great attention. This interest is driven by the fact that mesh-based methods such as the standard FEM and BEM may require prohibitive computational effort in handling high-dimensional, moving, and complex-shaped boundary problems. The Kansa method directly collocates the RBFs, especially the MQ, at the nodes without the need of mesh or elements and therefore is a meshless method.

Despite great effort, the rigorous mathematical proof of the solvability of the Kansa method is still missing. In addition, the mixed boundary conditions also destroy the symmetry of its interpolation matrix. Refs. propose the symmetric Hermite RBF collocation scheme with sound mathematical analysis of solvability. One common issue in the Kansa method and symmetric Hermite method, however, is that the numerical solutions at nodes adjacent to boundary deteriorate by one to two orders of magnitude compared with those in central region. The PDE collocation on the boundary (PDECB) effectively remove this shortcoming. However, this strategy requires an additional set of nodes inside or outside of the domain adjacent to the boundary. The arbitrary placing of these additional nodes gives rise to troublesome issues in the simulation of complex and multiply-connected domain problems. The PDECB also lacks explicit theoretical endorsement. In fact, a similar strategy has also been proposed, which collocates both governing and boundary equations on the same boundary nodes. However, the method is unsymmetrical and still lacks explicit theoretical foundation. By using the Green second identity, the modified Kansa method is devised to remedy all aforementioned weaknesses. For the MQ, its shape parameter largely determines its interpolation error. There exist a number of mathematical theories concerning the family of multiquadric radial basis functions and providing some suggestions on the choice of the shape parameter.

The Kansa method has been applied widely in computational sciences. In, the Kansa method is employed to address the parabolic, hyperbolic and elliptic partial differential equations. Kansa method has recently been extended to various ordinary and PDEs including the bi-phasic and triphasic mixture models of tissue engineering problems, 1D nonlinear Burger's equation with shock wave, shallow water equations for tide and current simulation, heat transfer problems, free boundary problems, and fractional diffusion equations.

== See also ==
- Radial basis function
- Method of fundamental solutions
- Boundary knot method
- Boundary particle method
- Singular boundary method
