= Trefftz =

Trefftz is a German surname.

It can refer to:

- Erich Trefftz (1888–1937), German mathematician
  - Trefftz method, a method for the numerical solution of partial differential equations
- Eleonore Trefftz (1920–2017), German physicist, Erich Trefftz's daughter
  - 7266 Trefftz, a minor planet named after Eleonore Trefftz
