= Regularized meshless method =

In numerical mathematics, the regularized meshless method (RMM), also known as the singular meshless method or desingularized meshless method, is a meshless boundary collocation method designed to solve certain partial differential equations whose fundamental solution is explicitly known. The RMM is a strong-form collocation method with merits being meshless, integration-free, easy-to-implement, and high stability. Until now this method has been successfully applied to some typical problems, such as potential, acoustics, water wave, and inverse problems of bounded and unbounded domains.

== Description ==
The RMM employs the double layer potentials from the potential theory as its basis/kernel functions. Like the method of fundamental solutions (MFS), the numerical solution is approximated by a linear combination of double layer kernel functions with respect to different source points. Unlike the MFS, the collocation and source points of the RMM, however, are coincident and placed on the physical boundary without the need of a fictitious boundary in the MFS. Thus, the RMM overcomes the major bottleneck in the MFS applications to the real world problems.

Upon the coincidence of the collocation and source points, the double layer kernel functions will present various orders of singularity. Thus, a subtracting and adding-back regularizing technique is introduced and, hence, removes or cancels such singularities.

== History and recent development ==
These days the finite element method (FEM), finite difference method (FDM), finite volume method (FVM), and boundary element method (BEM) are dominant numerical techniques in numerical modelings of many fields of engineering and sciences. Mesh generation is tedious and even very challenging problems in their solution of high-dimensional moving or complex-shaped boundary problems and is computationally costly and often mathematically troublesome.

The BEM has long been claimed to alleviate such drawbacks thanks to the boundary-only discretizations and its semi-analytical nature. Despite these merits, the BEM, however, involves quite sophisticated mathematics and some tricky singular integrals. Moreover, surface meshing in a three-dimensional domain remains to be a nontrivial task. Over the past decades, considerable efforts have been devoted to alleviating or eliminating these difficulties, leading to the development of meshless/meshfree boundary collocation methods which require neither domain nor boundary meshing. Among these methods, the MFS is the most popular with the merit of easy programming, mathematical simplicity, high accuracy, and fast convergence.

In the MFS, a fictitious boundary outside the problem domain is required in order to avoid the singularity of the fundamental solution. However, determining the optimal location of the fictitious boundary is a nontrivial task to be studied. Dramatic efforts have ever since been made to remove this long perplexing issue. Recent advances include, for example, boundary knot method (BKM), regularized meshless method (RMM), modified MFS (MMFS), and singular boundary method (SBM)

The methodology of the RMM was firstly proposed by Young and his collaborators in 2005. The key idea is to introduce a subtracting and adding-back regularizing technique to remove the singularity of the double layer kernel function at the origin, so that the source points can be placed directly on the real boundary. Up to now, the RMM has successfully been applied to a variety of physical problems, such as potential, exterior acoustics antiplane piezo-electricity, acoustic eigenproblem with multiply-connected domain, inverse problem, possion’ equation and water wave problems. Furthermore, some improved formulations have been made aiming to further improve the feasibility and efficiency of this method, see, for example, the weighted RMM for irregular domain problems and analytical RMM for 2D Laplace problems.

== See also ==
- Radial basis function
- Boundary element method
- Method of fundamental solutions
- Boundary knot method
- Boundary particle method
- Singular boundary method
