= Elisabeth Larsson (mathematician) =

Swedish applied mathematician and numerical analyst

Elisabeth Larsson (born December 30, 1971) is a Swedish applied mathematician and numerical analyst. She is a professor in the Department of Information Technology of Uppsala University, and was the director of the Uppsala Multidisciplinary Centre for Advanced Computational Science 2016-2024.

== Research ==
Larsson's research involves the applications of radial basis functions to scientific computing. It has included work on the propagation of sound waves through water, pricing of financial options, and simulation of the Earth's climate.

== Education and career ==
Larsson was born on December 30, 1971 in Ljusdal, and went to high school in Ljusdal. She earned a master's degree in engineering physics at Uppsala University in 1994, and completed a Ph.D. in numerical analysis at Uppsala University in 2000. Her dissertation was Domain Decomposition and Preconditioned Iterative Methods for the Helmholtz Equation. Her doctorate was supervised by Kurt Otto, with Bengt Fornberg as outside examiner.

She became a junior researcher in the Department of Information Technology at Uppsala University in 2001, and an assistant professor in 2007. She was promoted to senior lecturer (associate professor) in 2011 and professor in 2020.

== Recognition ==
In 2007, Larsson was one of two winners of the Göran Gustafsson Award for outstanding young Swedish scientists.
