= Gas electron diffraction =

Method of observing gaseous atomic structure

Gas electron diffraction (GED) is one of the applications of electron diffraction techniques. The target of this method is the determination of the structure of gaseous molecules, i.e., the geometrical arrangement of the atoms from which a molecule is built up. GED is one of two experimental methods (besides microwave spectroscopy) to determine the structure of free molecules, undistorted by intermolecular forces, which are omnipresent in the solid and liquid state. The determination of accurate molecular structures by GED studies is fundamental for an understanding of structural chemistry.

== Introduction ==
Diffraction occurs because the wavelength of electrons accelerated by a potential of a few thousand volts is of the same order of magnitude as internuclear distances in molecules. The principle is the same as that of other electron diffraction methods such as LEED and RHEED, but the obtainable diffraction pattern is considerably weaker than those of LEED and RHEED because the density of the target is about one thousand times smaller. Since the orientation of the target molecules relative to the electron beams is random, the internuclear distance information obtained is one-dimensional. Thus only relatively simple molecules can be completely structurally characterized by electron diffraction in the gas phase. It is possible to combine information obtained from other sources, such as rotational spectra, NMR spectroscopy or high-quality quantum-mechanical calculations with electron diffraction data, if the latter are not sufficient to determine the molecule's structure completely.

The total scattering intensity in GED is given as a function of the momentum transfer, which is defined as the difference between the wave vector of the incident electron beam and that of the scattered electron beam and has the reciprocal dimension of length. The total scattering intensity is composed of two parts: the atomic scattering intensity and the molecular scattering intensity. The former decreases monotonically and contains no information about the molecular structure. The latter has sinusoidal modulations as a result of the interference of the scattering spherical waves generated by the scattering from the atoms included in the target molecule. The interferences reflect the distributions of the atoms composing the molecules, so the molecular structure is determined from this part.

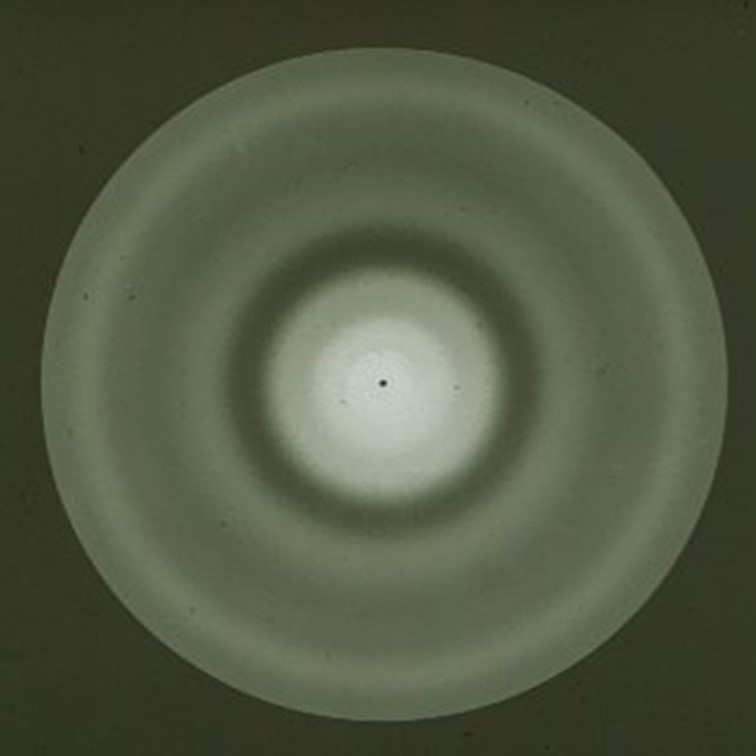
Figure 2: Diffraction pattern of gaseous benzene

== Experiment ==
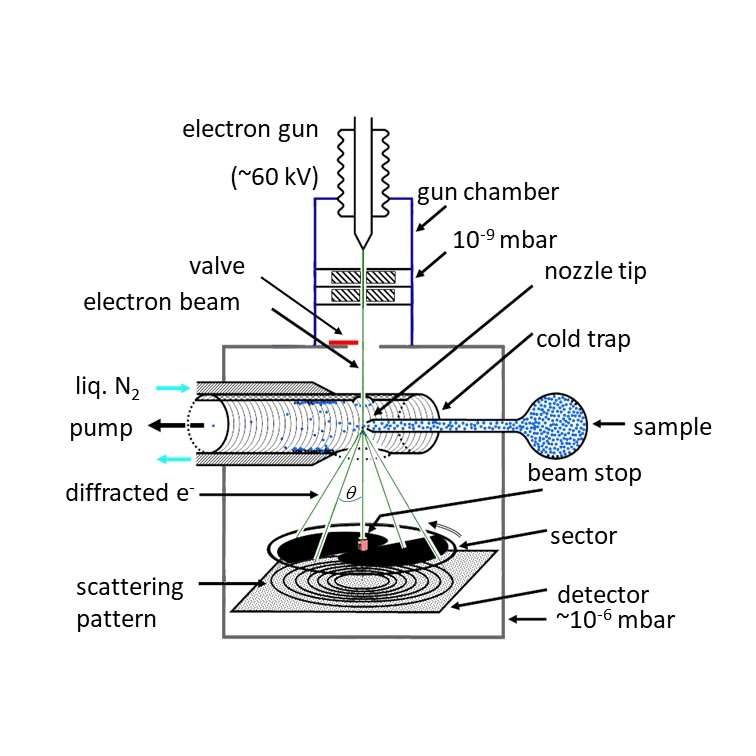
Scheme 1: Schematic drawing of an electron diffraction apparatus

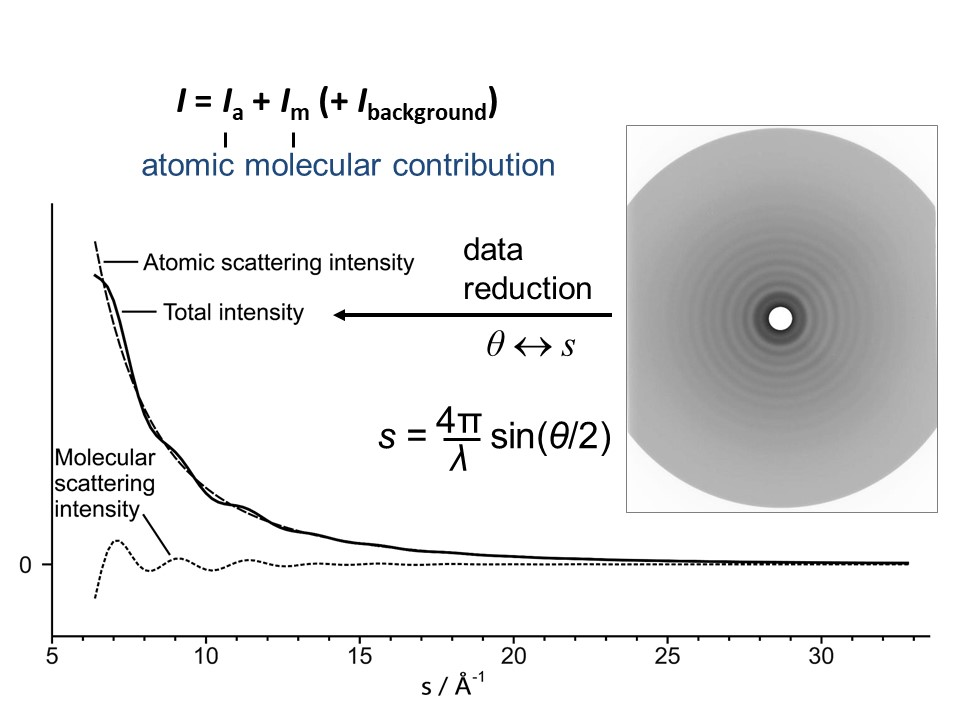
Scheme 2: Data reduction process from the concentric scattering pattern to the molecular scattering intensity curve

Figure 1 shows a drawing and a photograph of an electron diffraction apparatus. Scheme 1 shows the schematic procedure of an electron diffraction experiment. A fast electron beam is generated in an electron gun, enters a diffraction chamber typically at a vacuum of 10^{−7} mbar. The electron beam hits a perpendicular stream of a gaseous sample effusing from a nozzle of a small diameter (typically 0.2 mm). At this point, the electrons are scattered. Most of the sample is immediately condensed and frozen onto the surface of a cold trap held at -196 °C (liquid nitrogen). The scattered electrons are detected on the surface of a suitable detector in a well-defined distance to the point of scattering.

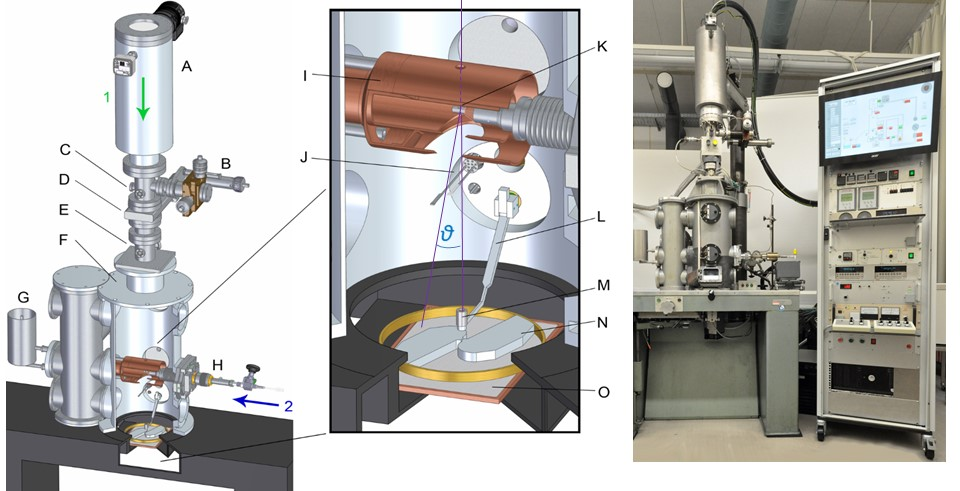
Figure 1: Gas-diffraction apparatus at the University of Bielefeld, Germany

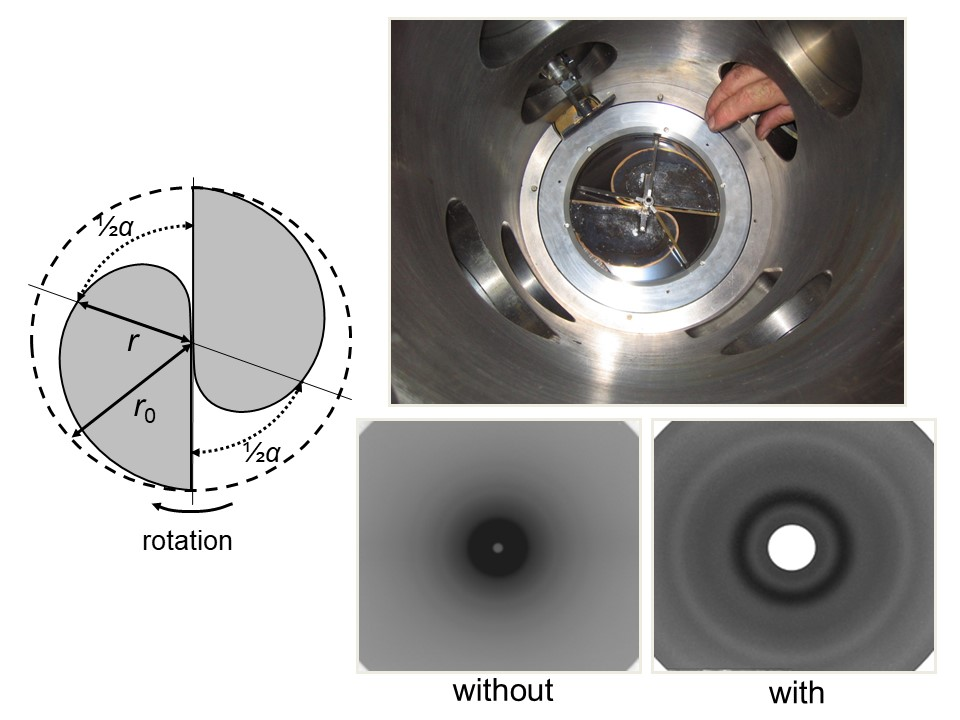
Figure 3: Scheme of a rotating sector, placement of the rotating sector within a GED apparatus and two examples of diffraction pattrens recorded with and without rotating sector.

The scattering pattern consists of diffuse concentric rings (see Figure 2). The steep decent of intensity can be compensated for by passing the electrons through a fast rotation sector (Figure 3). This is cut in a way, that electrons with small scattering angles are more shadowed than those at wider scattering angles. The detector can be a photographic plate, an electron imaging plate (usual technique today) or other position sensitive devices such as hybrid pixel detectors (future technique).

The intensities generated from reading out the plates or processing intensity data from other detectors are then corrected for the sector effect. They are initially a function of distance between primary beam position and intensity, and then converted into a function of scattering angle. The so-called atomic intensity and the experimental background are subtracted to give the final experimental molecular scattering intensities as a function of s (the change of momentum).

These data are then processed by suitable fitting software like UNEX for refining a suitable model for the compound and to yield precise structural information in terms of bond lengths, angles and torsional angles.

== Theory ==
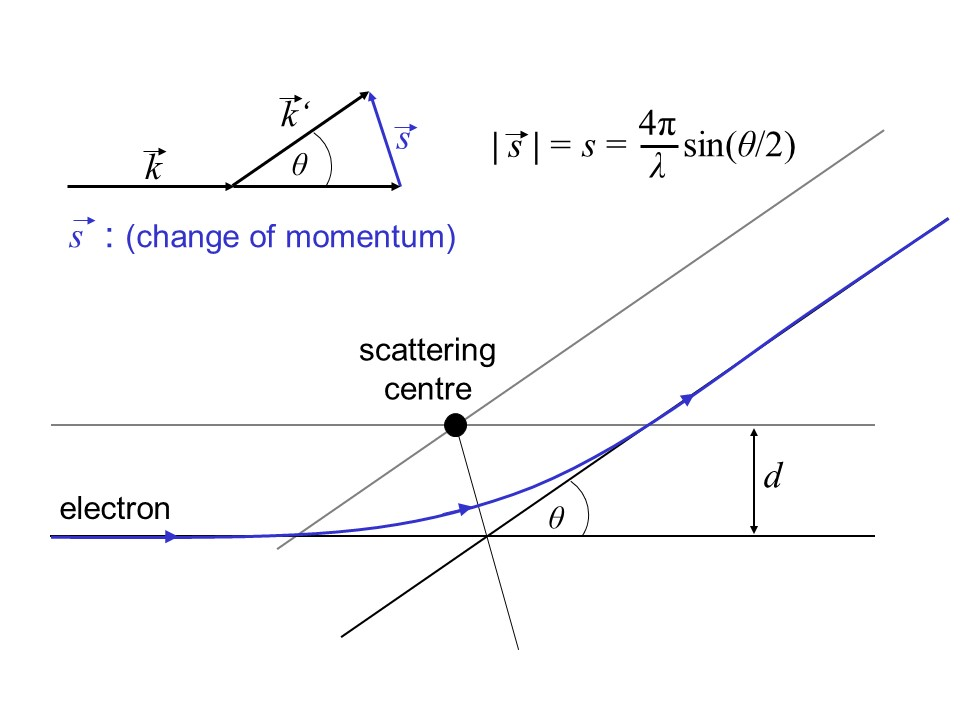
Scheme 2: Schematic scattering process of an electron passing a positively charged atomic nucleus

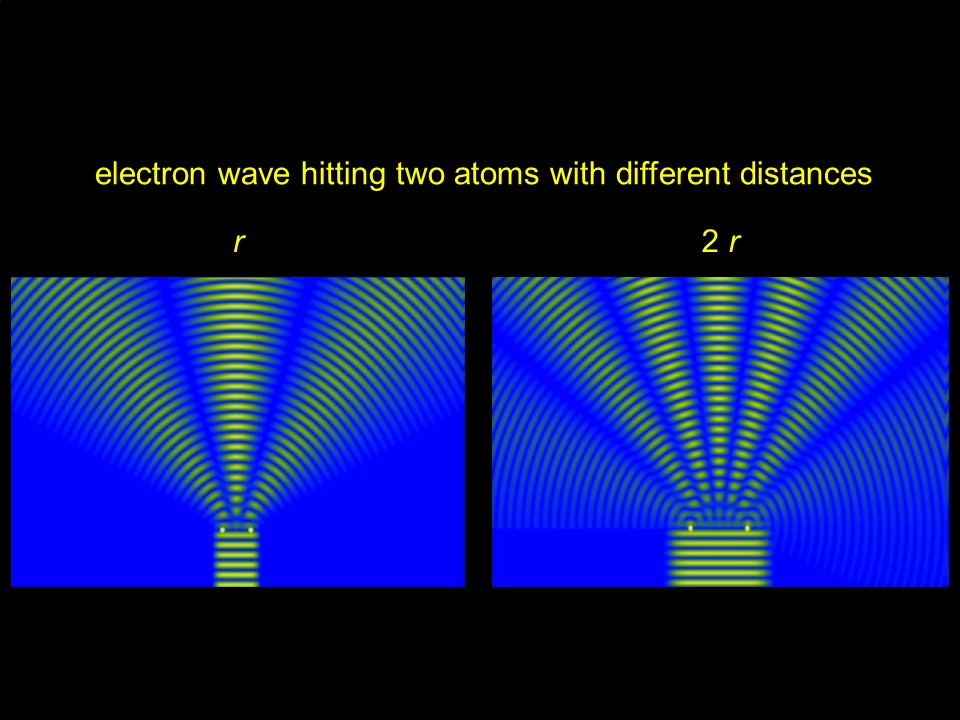
Firgure 4. Electron wave scattered at a pair of atomic nuclei at different distances

GED can be described by scattering theory. The outcome if applied to gases with randomly oriented molecules is provided here in short:

Scattering occurs at each individual atom ($I_\text{a}(s)$), but also at pairs (also called molecular scattering) ($I_\text{m}(s)$), or triples ($I_\text{t}(s)$), of atoms.

$s$ is the scattering variable or change of electron momentum, and its absolute value is defined as

$$|s| = \frac{4\pi}{\lambda} \sin(\theta / 2),$$

with $\lambda$ being the electron wavelength defined above, and $\theta$ being the scattering angle.

The above-mentioned contributions of scattering add up to the total scattering

$$I_\text{tot}(s) = I_\text{a}(s) + I_\text{m}(s) + I_\text{t}(s) + I_\text{b}(s),$$

where $I_\text{b}(s)$ is the experimental background intensity, which is needed to describe the experiment completely.

The contribution of individual atom scattering is called atomic scattering and easy to calculate:

$$I_\text{a}(s) = \frac{K^2}{R^2} I_0 \sum_{i=1}^N |f_i(s)|^2,$$

with $K = \frac{8 \pi^2 me^2}{h^2}$, $R$ being the distance between the point of scattering and the detector, $I_0$ being the intensity of the primary electron beam, and $f_i(s)$ being the scattering amplitude of the i-th atom. In essence, this is a summation over the scattering contributions of all atoms independent of the molecular structure. $I_\text{a}(s)$ is the main contribution and easily obtained if the atomic composition of the gas (sum formula) is known.

The most interesting contribution is the molecular scattering, because it contains information about the distance between all pairs of atoms in a molecule (bonded or non-bonded):

$$I_\text{m}(s) = \frac{K^2}{R^2} I_0 \sum_{i=1}^N \sum_{j=1,i\neq j}^N |f_i(s)|\,|f_j(s)| \frac{\sin[s(r_{ij} - \kappa s^2)]}{sr_{ij}}e^{-\frac{1}{2} l_{ij} s^2} \cos[\eta_i(s) - \eta_i(s)],$$

with $r_{ij}$ being the parameter of main interest: the atomic distance between two atoms, $l_{ij}$ being the mean square amplitude of vibration between the two atoms, $\kappa$ the anharmonicity constant (correcting the vibration description for deviations from a purely harmonic model), and $\eta$ is a phase factor, which becomes important if a pair of atoms with very different nuclear charge is involved.

The first part is similar to the atomic scattering, but contains two scattering factors of the involved atoms. Summation is performed over all atom pairs.

$I_\text{t}(s)$ is negligible in most cases and not described here in more detail. $I_\text{b}(s)$ is mostly determined by fitting and subtracting smooth functions to account for the background contribution.

So it is the molecular scattering intensity that is of interest, and this is obtained by calculation all other contributions and subtracting them from the experimentally measured total scattering function.

== Results ==
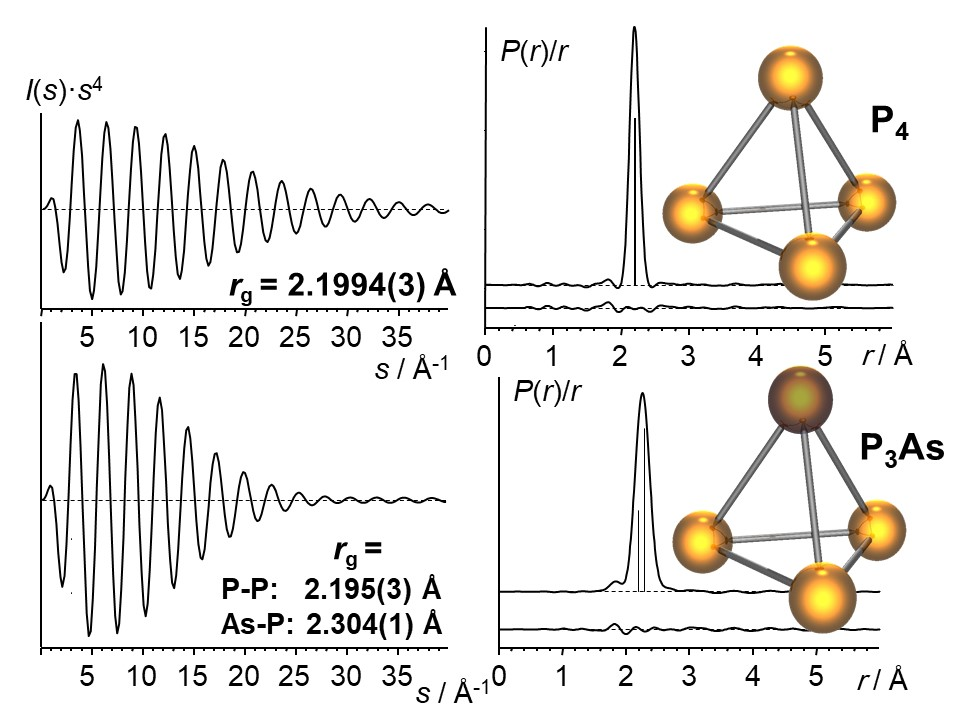
Figure 5: Examples of molecular intensity curves (left) and their Fourier transforms, the radial distribution curves of P4 and P3As.

Figure 5 shows two typical examples of results. The molecular scattering intensity curves are used to refine a structural model by means of a least squares fitting program. This yields precise structural information. The Fourier transformation of the molecular scattering intensity curves gives the radial distribution curves (RDC). These represent the probability to find a certain distance between two nuclei of a molecule. The curves below the RDC represent the difference between the experiment and the model, i.e. the quality of fit.

The very simple example in Figure 5 shows the results for evaporated white phosphorus, P_{4}, which is a perfectly tetrahedral molecule and has thus only one P-P distance. This makes the molecular scattering intensity curve a very simple one; a sine curve which is damped due to molecular vibration. The radial distribution curve (RDC) shows a maximum at 2.1994 Å with a least-squares error of 0.0003 Å, represented as 2.1994(3) Å. The width of the peak represents the molecular vibration and is the result of Fourier transformation of the damping part. This peak width means that the P-P distance varies by this vibration within a certain range given as a vibrational amplitude u, in this example u_{T}(P‒P) = 0.0560(5) Å.

The slightly more complicated molecule P_{3}As has two different distances P-P and P-As. Because their contributions overlap in the RDC, the peak is broader (also seen in a more rapid damping in the molecular scattering). The determination of these two independent parameters is more difficult and results in less precise parameter values than for P_{4}.

Some selected other examples of important contributions to the structural chemistry of molecules are provided here:

- Structure of diborane B_{2}H_{6}
- Structure of the planar trisilylamine
- Determinations of the structures of gaseous elemental phosphorus P_{4} and of the binary P_{3}As
- Determination of the structure of C_{60} and C_{70}
- Structure of tetranitromethane
- Absence of local C_{3} symmetry in the simplest phosphonium ylide H_{2}C=PMe_{3} and in amino-phosphanes like P(NMe_{2)3} and ylides H_{2}C=P(NMe_{2})_{3}
- Determination of intramolecular London dispersion interaction effects on gas-phase and solid-state structures of diamondoid dimers

== Links ==
- http://molwiki.org/wiki/Main_Page—A free encyclopaedia, mainly focused on molecular structure and dynamics.
- The story of gas-phase electron diffraction (GED) in Norway
