= Henk M. Haitjema =

Dutch-American hydrologist

Hendrik Marten Haitjema (born 1947) is a Dutch and American engineer and hydrologist, and professor emeritus at Indiana University. He is a recipient of the 2017 Keith A. Anderson Award of the National Ground Water Association. He is the author of the book Analytic Element Modeling of Groundwater Flow and the widely used computational groundwater flow modeling system GFLOW.

== Education and career ==
Haitjema is originally from Dedemsvaart, The Netherlands. He earned an M.S. (Ingeniers) in Civil Engineering in 1976 from the Delft University of Technology. He came to America in 1978 and joined Professor Otto D.L. Strack at the University of Minnesota to work on the first computer model to implement the analytic element method for groundwater flow mechanics. He earned a Ph.D. in Civil Engineering in 1982 from the University of Minnesota and became an associate professor in the Department of Civil and Mineral Engineering at the University of Minnesota. In 1984, he joined the faculty of Indiana University as an Associate Professor to teach groundwater flow modeling and applied mathematics and was promoted to Full Professor in 1997. His research has been supported by the US Geological Survey, US Environmental Protection Agency, US Forest Service, US Department of Energy, National Institute for Global and Environmental Change, and the Indiana Department of Environmental Management. He retired from Indiana University in 2012. While at IU, he mentored 7 Ph.D. students, and numerous Masters students, several of whom produced a research thesis. He was editor-in-chief of the journal Groundwater from 2014 to 2020.

== Selected publications ==
- Haitjema, H. (2006). "The role of hand calculations in ground water flow modeling". Groundwater. 44 (6): 786–791. Bibcode:2006GrWat..44..786H. doi:10.1111/j.1745-6584.2006.00189.x. PMID 17087749. S2CID 10559430.
- Hunt, R.J.; Haitjema, H.M.; Krohelski, J.T.; Feinstein, D.T. (2003). "Simulating ground water-lake interactions: approaches and insights". Groundwater. 41 (2): 227–237. Bibcode:2003GrWat..41..227H. doi:10.1111/j.1745-6584.2003.tb02586.x. PMID 12656289. S2CID 22697296.
- Haitjema, H.M. (1995). "On the residence time distribution in idealized groundwatersheds". Journal of Hydrology. 172 (1–4): 127–146. Bibcode:1995JHyd..172..127H. doi:10.1016/0022-1694(95)02732-5.
- Haitjema, Henk M. (1987). "Comparing a three-dimensional and a Dupuit-Forchheimer solution for a circular recharge area in a confined aquifer". Journal of Hydrology. 91 (1–2): 83–101. Bibcode:1987JHyd...91...83H. doi:10.1016/0022-1694(87)90130-2.
- Haitjema, Henk M. (1985). "Modeling three-dimensional flow in confined aquifers by superposition of both two- and three-dimensional analytic functions". Water Resources Research. 21 (10): 1557–1566. Bibcode:1985WRR....21.1557H. doi:10.1029/wr021i010p01557.
- Strack, O.D.L.; Haitjema, H.M. (1981). "Modeling double aquifer flow using a comprehensive potential and distributed singularities: 2. solution for inhomogeneous permeability". Water Resources Research. 17 (5): 1551–1560. Bibcode:1981WRR....17.1551S. doi:10.1029/WR017i005p01551.
- Strack, O.D.L.; Haitjema, H.M. (1981). "Modeling double aquifer flow using a comprehensive potential and distributed singularities: 1. solution for homogeneous permeability". Water Resources Research. 17 (5): 1535–1549. Bibcode:1981WRR....17.1535S. doi:10.1029/WR017i005p01535.

== Recognition ==
- Keith E. Anderson Award of the National Ground Water Association (2017)
- Bechert Award of the Indiana Water Resources Association (2013)
- Braun/Braun Intertec Visiting Professorship, University of Minnesota (2005)
