= Analytic element method =

The analytic element method (AEM) is a numerical method used for the solution of partial differential equations. It was initially developed by O.D.L. Strack at the University of Minnesota. It is similar in nature to the boundary element method (BEM), as it does not rely upon the discretization of volumes or areas in the modeled system; only internal and external boundaries are discretized. One of the primary distinctions between AEM and BEMs is that the boundary integrals are calculated analytically. Although originally developed to model groundwater flow, AEM has subsequently been applied to other fields of study including studies of heat flow and conduction, periodic waves, and deformation by force.

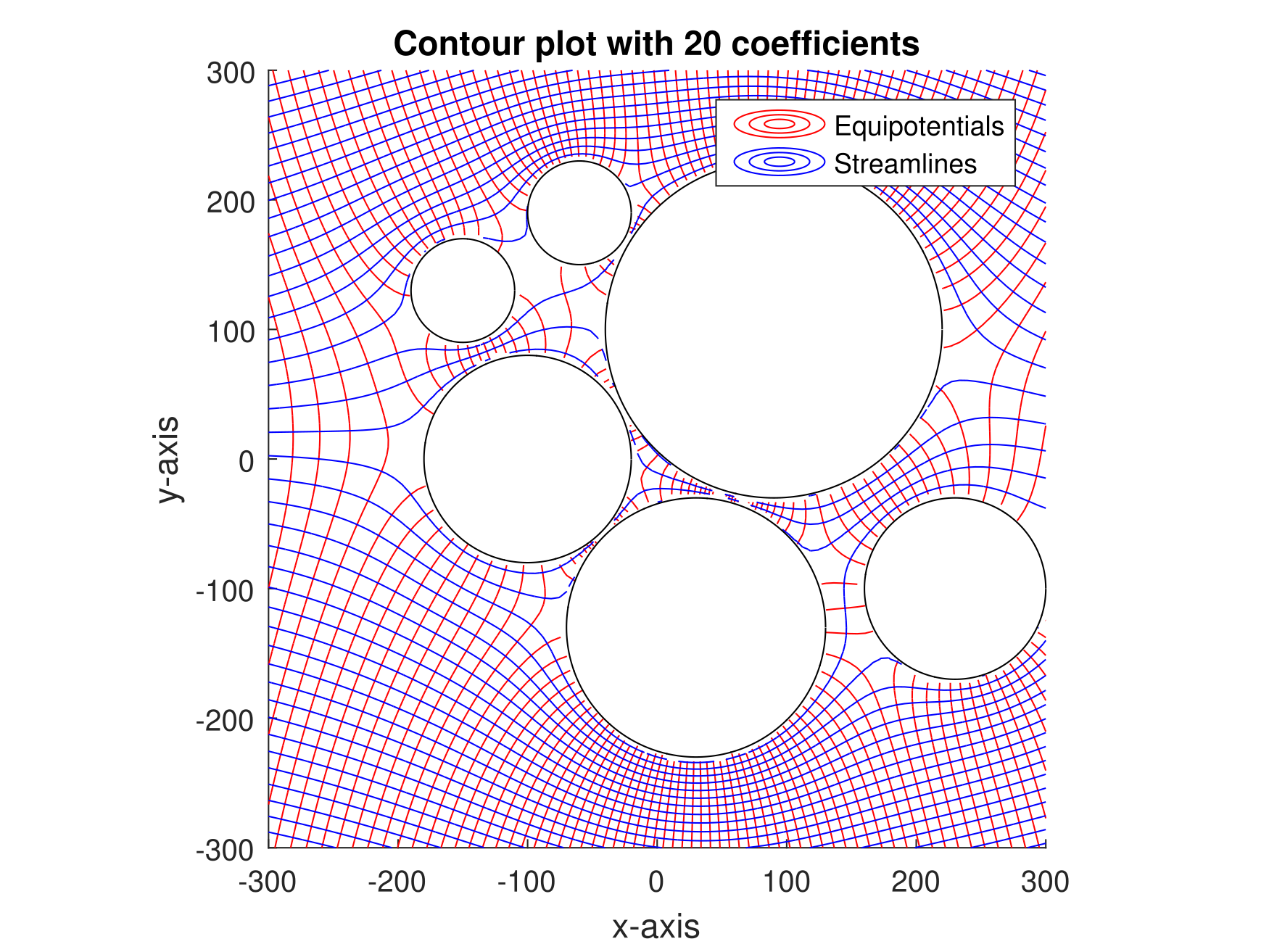
Flow around impermeable cylinders. Solved with the AEM using 20 coefficients in the series expansions.

== Mathematical basis ==
The basic premise of the analytic element method is that, for linear differential equations, elementary solutions may be superimposed to obtain more complex solutions. A suite of 2D and 3D analytic solutions ("elements") are available for different governing equations. These elements typically correspond to a discontinuity in the dependent variable or its gradient along a geometric boundary (e.g., point, line, ellipse, circle, sphere, etc.). This discontinuity has a specific functional form (usually a polynomial in 2D) and may be manipulated to satisfy Dirichlet, Neumann, or Robin (mixed) boundary conditions. Each analytic solution is infinite in space and/or time.

Commonly each analytic solution contains degrees of freedom (coefficients) that may be calculated to meet prescribed boundary conditions along the element's border. To obtain a global solution (i.e., the correct element coefficients), a system of equations is solved such that the boundary conditions are satisfied along all of the elements (using collocation, least-squares minimization, or a similar approach). Notably, the global solution provides a spatially continuous description of the dependent variable everywhere in the infinite domain, and the governing equation is satisfied everywhere exactly except along the border of the element, where the governing equation is not strictly applicable due to discontinuity.

The ability to superpose numerous elements in a single solution means that analytical solutions can be realized for arbitrarily complex boundary conditions. That is, models that have complex geometries, straight or curved boundaries, multiple boundaries, transient boundary conditions, multiple aquifer layers, piecewise varying properties, and continuously varying properties can be solved. Elements can be implemented using far-field expansions such that models containing many thousands of elements can be solved efficiently to high precision.

The analytic element method has been applied to problems of groundwater flow governed by a variety of linear partial differential equations including the Laplace, the Poisson equation, the modified Helmholtz equation, the heat equation, and the biharmonic equations. Often these equations are solved using complex variables which enables using mathematical techniques available in complex variable theory. A useful technique to solve complex problems is using conformal mapping which maps the boundary of a geometry, e.g. an ellipse, onto the boundary of the unit circle where the solution is known.

In the analytic element method the discharge potential and stream function, or combined the complex potential, are used. This potential links the physical properties of the groundwater system, the hydraulic head or flow boundaries, to a mathematical representation of a potential. This mathematical representation can be used to calculate the potential in terms of position and thus also solve groundwater flow problems. Elements are developed by solving the boundary conditions for either of these two properties, hydraulic head or flow boundary, which results in analytical solutions capable of dealing with numerous boundary conditions.

== Comparison to other methods ==
As mentioned the analytic element method thus does not rely on the discretization of volume or area in the model, as in the finite elements or finite different methods. Thus, it can model complex problems with an error in the order of machine precision. This is illustrated in a study that modeled a highly heterogeneous, isotropic aquifer by including 100,000 spherical heterogeneity with a random conductivity and tracing 40,000 particles. The analytical element method can efficiently be used as verification or as a screening tool in larger projects as it may fast and accurately calculate the groundwater flow for many complex problems.

In contrast to other commonly used groundwater modeling methods, e.g. the finite elements or finite different method, the AEM does not discretize the model domain into cells. This gives the advantage that the model is valid for any given point in the model domain. However, it also imposes that the domain is not as easily divided into regions of e.g. different hydraulic conductivity, as when modeling with a cell grid; however, one solution to this problem is to include subdomains to the AEM model. There also exist solutions for implementing vertically varying properties or structures in an aquifer in an AEM model.

== See also ==
- Boundary element method
- Conformal mapping
- Superposition principle

== Further read ==
- Haitjema, H. M. (1995). Analytic element modeling of groundwater flow (PDF). San Diego, CA: Academic Press. ISBN 978-0-12-316550-3.
- Strack, O. D. L. (1989). Groundwater Mechanics. Englewood Cliffs, NJ: Prentice Hall.
- Fitts, C. R. (2012). Groundwater Science (2nd ed.). San Diego, CA: Elsevier/Academic Press. ISBN 9780123847058.
