= Radial function =

Real function on a Euclidean space whose value depends only on distance from the origin

In mathematics, a radial function is a real-valued function defined on a Euclidean space $\R^n$ whose value at each point depends only on the distance between that point and the origin. The distance is usually the Euclidean distance. For example, a radial function Φ in two dimensions has the form $\Phi(x,y) = \varphi(r), \quad r = \sqrt{x^2+y^2}$ where φ is a function of a single non-negative real variable. Radial functions are contrasted with spherical functions, and any descent function (e.g., continuous and rapidly decreasing) on Euclidean space can be decomposed into a series consisting of radial and spherical parts: the solid spherical harmonic expansion.

A function is radial if and only if it is invariant under all rotations leaving the origin fixed. That is, f is radial if and only if $f\circ \rho = f\,$ for all ρ ∈ SO(n), the special orthogonal group in n dimensions. This characterization of radial functions makes it possible also to define radial distributions. These are distributions S on $\R^n$ such that $S[\varphi] = S[\varphi\circ\rho]$ for every test function φ and rotation ρ.

Given any (locally integrable) function f, its radial part is given by averaging over spheres centered at the origin. To wit, $\phi(x) = \frac{1}{\omega_{n-1}}\int_{S^{n-1}} f(rx')\,dx'$ where ω_{n−1} is the surface area of the (n−1)-sphere S^{n−1}, and r = |x|, x′ = x/r. It follows essentially by Fubini's theorem that a locally integrable function has a well-defined radial part at almost every r.

The Fourier transform of a radial function is also radial, and so radial functions play a vital role in Fourier analysis. Furthermore, the Fourier transform of a radial function typically has stronger decay behavior at infinity than non-radial functions: for radial functions bounded in a neighborhood of the origin, the Fourier transform decays faster than R^{−(n−1)/2}. The Bessel functions are a special class of radial function that arise naturally in Fourier analysis as the radial eigenfunctions of the Laplacian; as such they appear naturally as the radial portion of the Fourier transform.

== See also ==
- Radial basis function
