= Erich Trefftz =

German mathematician

Erich Immanuel Trefftz
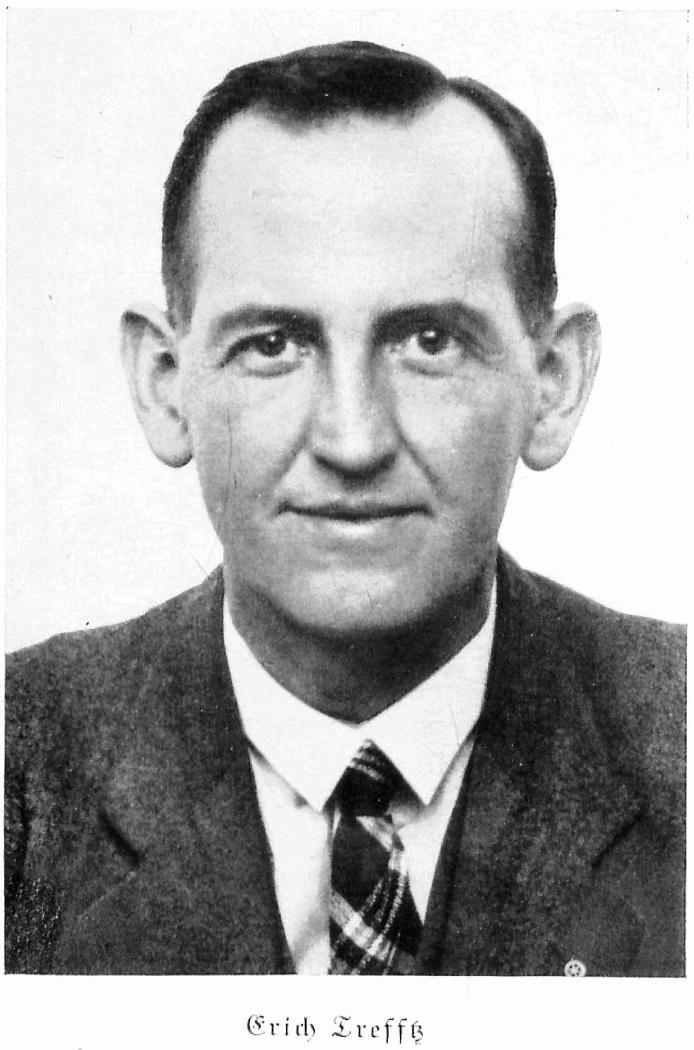
- Born: 21 February 1888; Leipzig, Germany
- Died: 21 January 1937 (aged 48); Dresden, Germany
- Scientific career
- Fields: Aerodynamics

Erich Immanuel Trefftz (born 21 February 1888 in Leipzig, died 21 January 1937 in Dresden) was a German mathematician, aerodynamicist and university professor.

== Life ==
Erich Trefftz was the son of merchant Oskar Trefftz (1848–1906) and Anna Eliza, née Runge. His uncle was mathematician Carl Runge. From 1897 he attended the Thomasschule in Leipzig. In 1900 the family moved to Aachen.

Trefftz graduated from the Kaiser-Wilhelm-Gymnasium in Aachen in 1906. He studied mechanical engineering at the Aachen Technical University for two semesters, then changed subject to mathematics, which he continued from 1908 in Göttingen, where he studied under David Hilbert, Paul Koebe and Ludwig Prandtl. He completed a period of study at Columbia University in New York in 1909/10 and then continued his studies under Richard von Mises at the University of Strasbourg. From 1912 he worked as an assistant at the Aachen Technical University and received his doctorate in 1913 with the thesis "On the contraction of circular liquid jets". In the First World War, Trefftz was a volunteer and officer from 1914 until he was recalled to the Aerodynamic Institute in Aachen after being wounded in May 1917. During this time, he also wrote his habilitation thesis and was appointed professor of mathematics at the Aachen Technical University in 1919.

In 1918, he married Frieda Offermann. The couple had five children born between 1919 and 1926, including physicist Eleonore Trefftz, and radiologist Friederike Trefftz.

In 1922, Erich Trefftz was appointed to the Mechanical Department of the Technical University of Dresden and, as a full professor of technical mechanics, headed the chair of the same name in the Mathematics and Natural Sciences Department from 1927, where he focused particularly on aviation and, in this field, on hydrodynamics, elasticity theory and vibration theory. In 1926, Trefftz published a method for the "numerical, approximate solution of linear homogeneous boundary value problems for partial differential equations", which is now known as the "Trefftz method". In 1929, the Technical University of Stuttgart awarded him an honorary doctorate. From 1933, Erich Trefftz was editor of the Journal of Applied Mathematics and Mechanics of the Society for Applied Mathematics and Mechanics, which was continued after his death by Friedrich Adolf Willers. In November 1933, he signed the German professors' declaration of allegiance to Adolf Hitler. In 1934, he received the Ackermann-Teubner Memorial Prize. During the Nazi era, Trefftz advocated for numerous Jewish colleagues, as well as politically persecuted individuals such as Friedrich Adolf Willers. From 1936, Trefftz worked three days a week at the German Research Institute for Aviation in Berlin-Adlershof. At roughly the same time, he became co-editor of the Gelbe Springersche Sammlung (Yellow Springer Collection).

His explanation of induced drag is known as "Trefftz-plane theory".

Erich Trefftz died in Dresden in 1937, aged 48, after a serious illness. His urn was interred in the Trefftz family plot (No. 31) in Section VIII of the New Johannis Cemetery in Leipzig. A commemorative inscription is located on the Trefftz family gravestone in the Loschwitz Cemetery. In 1987, a bust of Erich Trefftz was unveiled in the Willers Building of the TU Dresden. Since 1994, the lecture hall building of the mathematical and physical institutes of the TU Dresden has borne the name Trefftz Building. Part of his estate is now administered by the TU Dresden Archives.
