= Woodhead Publishing =

Academic publishing company

- Parent company: Elsevier
- Founded: 1989
- Founder: Martin Woodhead
- Headquarters location: Sawston, Cambridge
- Publication types: Books
- Imprints: Chandos Publishing, Horwood Publishing
- Official website: www.elsevier.com/books-and-journals/woodhead-publishing

Woodhead Publishing Limited was established in 1989 as an independent international publishing company of science and technical books. The company publishes books in association with The Textile Institute, Cambridge International Science Publishing. They have previously published books in association with The Institute of Materials, Minerals and Mining (IOM^{3}) and the European Federation of Corrosion.

== History ==
In December 2008 Woodhead Publishing acquired the backlist, future titles and imprint of Chandos Publishing in Witney, Oxford, UK, comprising over 250 books in the fields of library and information management, knowledge management and Asian Studies.

In 2011 they launched Woodhead Publishing Online, a resource of scientific, technical and information trends, comprising over 800 e-books, containing 12,000 chapters. This resource was hosted by MetaPress, a division of EBSCO Industries Inc.

Woodhead (and its imprint Chandos) was acquired by Elsevier in August 2013.

Its current areas of publication include food science, technology and nutrition, materials engineering, welding and metallurgy, textile technology, energy and environmental technology, watershed science, finance, commodities and business studies, mathematics and biomedicine.

== Imprints ==
- Chandos Publishing
- Horwood Publishing
- Abington Publishing

== Nominations and awards ==
In 2013, the company was announced as a contender for the Frankfurt Book Fair Academic & Professional Publisher of the Year award at this year's Independent Publishing Awards. Judges stated that "Woodhead has built up an unrivalled knowledge of its niche subjects and customers."

In 2012, the company was awarded the London Book Fair International Achievement Award by the Independent Publishers Guild.
