= Function approximation =

Approximating an arbitrary function with a well-behaved one

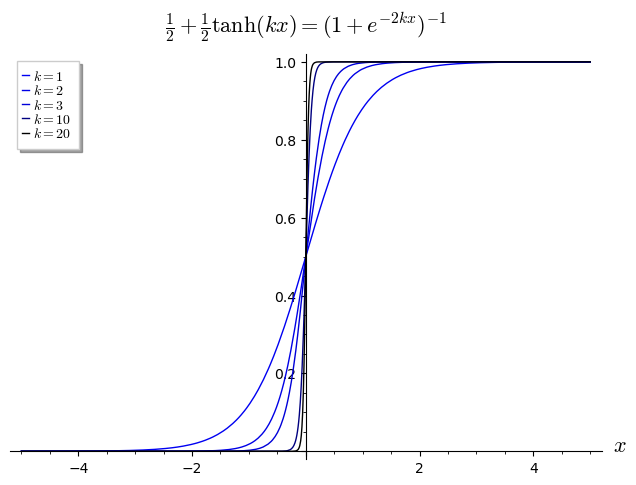
Several progressively more accurate approximations of the step function

An asymmetrical Gaussian function fit to a noisy curve using regression

In general, a function approximation problem asks us to select a function that closely matches ("approximates") a function in a task-specific way. The need for function approximations arises, for example, predicting the growth of microbes in microbiology. Function approximations are used where theoretical models are unavailable or hard to compute.

First, for known target functions approximation theory is the branch of numerical analysis that investigates how certain known functions (for example, special functions) can be approximated by a specific class of functions (for example, polynomials or rational functions) that often have desirable properties (inexpensive computation, continuity, integral and limit values, etc.).

Secondly, for example, if g is an operation on the real numbers, techniques of interpolation, extrapolation, regression analysis, and curve fitting can be used. If the codomain (range or target set) of g is a finite set, one is dealing with a classification problem instead.

== See also ==
- Approximation theory
- Fitness approximation
- Kriging
- Least squares (function approximation)
- Radial basis function network
