= Pose space deformation =

Computer animation technique

Pose space deformation is a computer animation technique which is used to deform a mesh on skeleton-driven animation. Common use of this technique is to deform the shape of a mesh (for example, an arm) according to the angle of the joint (in this case, the elbow) bent. Although the name is commonly called Pose space deformation on many scholarly articles, 3D animation software rarely uses that name. On Autodesk Maya, it's implemented under the name Pose Deformer, and on Blender, it's implemented as Corrective Shape Keys. The first famous application of this technique was the cloth's movement on the first episode of the animated film The Animatrix. Industrial Light & Magic used a linear variant of this approach as one of the tools to animate the Hulk for The Avengers movie.

Fundamentally, pose space deformation (PSD) poses animation as an alternative class of interpolation. Rather than interpolate in time, as with animation curves, or over space, as with meshes, PSD views animation as interpolation over the domain of the character's pose. PSD was an early use of machine learning and neural networks in computer graphics: the radial basis interpolation that is often used to implement PSD is equivalent to a neural network with a radial nonlinearity.

== Working with skeletal-animation ==
PSD (Pose-Space Deformation) is often used in conjunction with skeletal animation to address some of its key limitations. In skeletal animation, a skeleton is linked to a 3D mesh using a technique called skinning. This connection between the skeleton and the mesh is typically established in a neutral pose, such as a T-pose. Vertices of the mesh are weighted and associated with one or more joints in the skeleton, and as the skeleton moves, the mesh deforms based on an interpolation of the associated joint movements.

However, this approach has limitations. Since it relies on a single neutral pose, it cannot effectively capture dynamic changes in muscle bulging, skin stretching, or the visibility of bones during movement—such as when an elbow bends. Additionally, skeletal animation often struggles with maintaining volume, especially in areas like the elbows and shoulders, where bending joints can cause undesirable deformations.

This is where Pose-Space Deformation comes in. PSD addresses these issues by allowing artists to create multiple poses, each representing a different shape or volume for specific key poses. Instead of relying solely on the skeleton's deformation, PSD adds corrective shapes on top of the skeletal animation to account for changes like muscle bulging, joint protrusion, or the preservation of volume around complex areas like the armpits and elbows. Artists can sculpt these additional poses to ensure that, for example, muscles bulge appropriately when the arm is flexed, or the elbow maintains its proper shape when bent.

Each sculpted pose in PSD is tied to a specific position of the skeleton, allowing for more accurate, nuanced deformations. This combination of skeletal animation and pose-based correction significantly enhances the realism of character movement, especially in areas where volume and surface detail are crucial.
