= Eleonore Trefftz =

German physicist

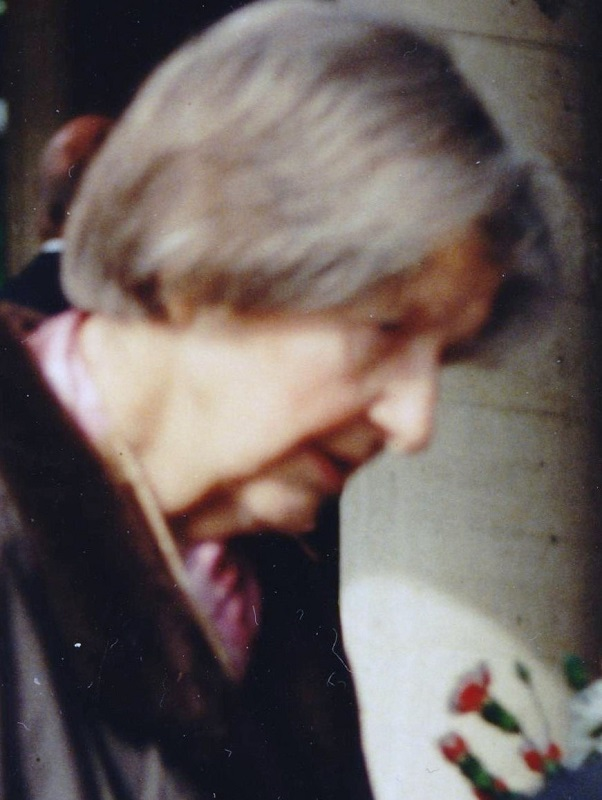
- Born: 15 August 1920; Aachen, Germany
- Died: 22 October 2017 (aged 97); Munich, Germany
- Scientific career
- Fields: Molecular and nuclear physics
- Institutions: Max Planck Institute for Physics and Astrophysics

Eleonore Trefftz (15 August 1920 – 22 October 2017) was a German physicist known for her work on molecular and nuclear physics. She was appointed as a Scientific Member of the Max Planck Institute for Physics and Astrophysics in 1971.

== Biography ==
Trefftz was born in Aachen, North Rhine-Westphalia, on 15 August 1920. She was raised in Loschwitz, Dresden from 1923, after her father Erich Trefftz was appointed as a professor of applied mechanics at TU Dresden in 1922. Between 1941 and 1945, Trefftz studied at TU Dresden and remained here until 1948, where she engaged in research and made assignments on theoretical physics, assisted by Friedrich Hund. In 1948, Trefftz became a research assistant at the Max Planck Institute in Göttingen, where she researched the transition probabilities of spectral lines.

In 1971, Trefftz became a Scientific Member of the Max Planck Institute for Physics and Astrophysics; she was the second woman to be appointed to the Max Planck Society, after Margot Becke-Goehring. While Trefftz primarily worked on molecular and nuclear physics, she was also associated with quantum chemistry. Trefftz helped develop programming techniques to assist the Max Planck Institute in using computerised data processing. She spent the remainder of her scientific career at the Max Planck Institute, becoming an Emeritus Scientific Member of the Institute for Astrophysics in Garching bei München upon her retirement. She died in Munich on 22 October 2017.

TU Dresden has introduced the Eleonore Trefftz Programme for Visiting Women Professors to support female scientists by providing year-long research and teaching roles. Minor planet 7266 Trefftz, discovered in 1973, was named in her honour.
