= Trefftz method =

Numerical method for solving certain differential equations

In mathematics, the Trefftz method is a method for the numerical solution of partial differential equations named after the German mathematician Erich Trefftz (1888–1937). It falls within the class of finite element methods.

== Introduction ==
The hybrid Trefftz finite-element method has been considerably advanced since its introduction by J. Jiroušek in the late 1970s. The conventional method of finite element analysis involves converting the differential equation that governs the problem into a variational functional from which element nodal properties – known as field variables – can be found. This can be solved by substituting in approximate solutions to the differential equation and generating the finite element stiffness matrix which is combined with all the elements in the continuum to obtain the global stiffness matrix. Application of the relevant boundary conditions to this global matrix, and the subsequent solution of the field variables rounds off the mathematical process, following which numerical computations can be used to solve real life engineering problems.

An important aspect of solving the functional requires us to find solutions that satisfy the given boundary conditions and satisfy inter-element continuity since we define independently the properties over each element domain.

The hybrid Trefftz method differs from the conventional finite element method in the assumed displacement fields and the formulation of the variational functional. In contrast to the conventional method (based on the Rayleigh-Ritz mathematical technique) the Trefftz method (based on the Trefftz mathematical technique) assumes the displacement field is composed of two independent components; the intra-element displacement field which satisfies the governing differential equation and is used to approximate the variation of potential within the element domain, and the conforming frame field which specifically satisfies the inter-element continuity condition, defined on the boundary of the element. The frame field here is the same as that used in the conventional finite element method but defined strictly on the boundary of the element – hence the use of the term "hybrid" in the method's nomenclature. The variational functional must thus include additional terms to account for boundary conditions, since the assumed solution field only satisfies the governing differential equation.

== Advantages over conventional finite element method ==
The main advantages of the hybrid Trefftz method over the conventional method are:

1. the formulation calls for integration along the element boundaries only which allows for curve-sided or polynomial shapes to be used for the element boundary,
2. presents expansion bases for elements that do not satisfy inter-element continuity through the variational functional, and
3. this method allows for the development of crack singular or perforated elements through the use of localized solution functions as the trial functions.

== Applications ==
This modified finite element method has become increasingly popular to applications such as elasticity, Kirchhoff plates, thick plates, general three-dimensional solid mechanics, antisymmetric solid mechanics, potential problems, shells, elastodynamic problems, geometrically nonlinear plate bending, and transient heat conduction analysis among various others. It is currently being applied to steady, non-turbulent, incompressible, Newtonian fluid flow applications through ongoing research at the Faculty of Engineering and Information Technology (FEIT) at the Australian National University (ANU) in Canberra, Australia. The hybrid Trefftz method is also being applied to some fields, e.g. computational modeling of hydrated soft tissues or water-saturated porous media, through ongoing research project at the Technical University of Lisbon, Instituto Superior Técnico in Portugal.
