= Robert Moser =

Robert Moser may refer to:

- Robert Moser (architect) (1833–1901), Swiss architect
- Robert Moser (engineer) (born 1956), American professor of engineering
- Robert Moser (business executive), American businessman
- Bruce Mozert (Robert Bruce Moser) (1916–2015), American photographer
- Robert Oswald Moser (1874–1953), British artist and illustrator
- Robert Derace Moser (1920–1943), American football player

== See also ==
- Bob Mosier, American law-enforcement officer and government official
