= Karen Willcox =

Aerospace engineer and computational scientist

Karen Willcox MNZM
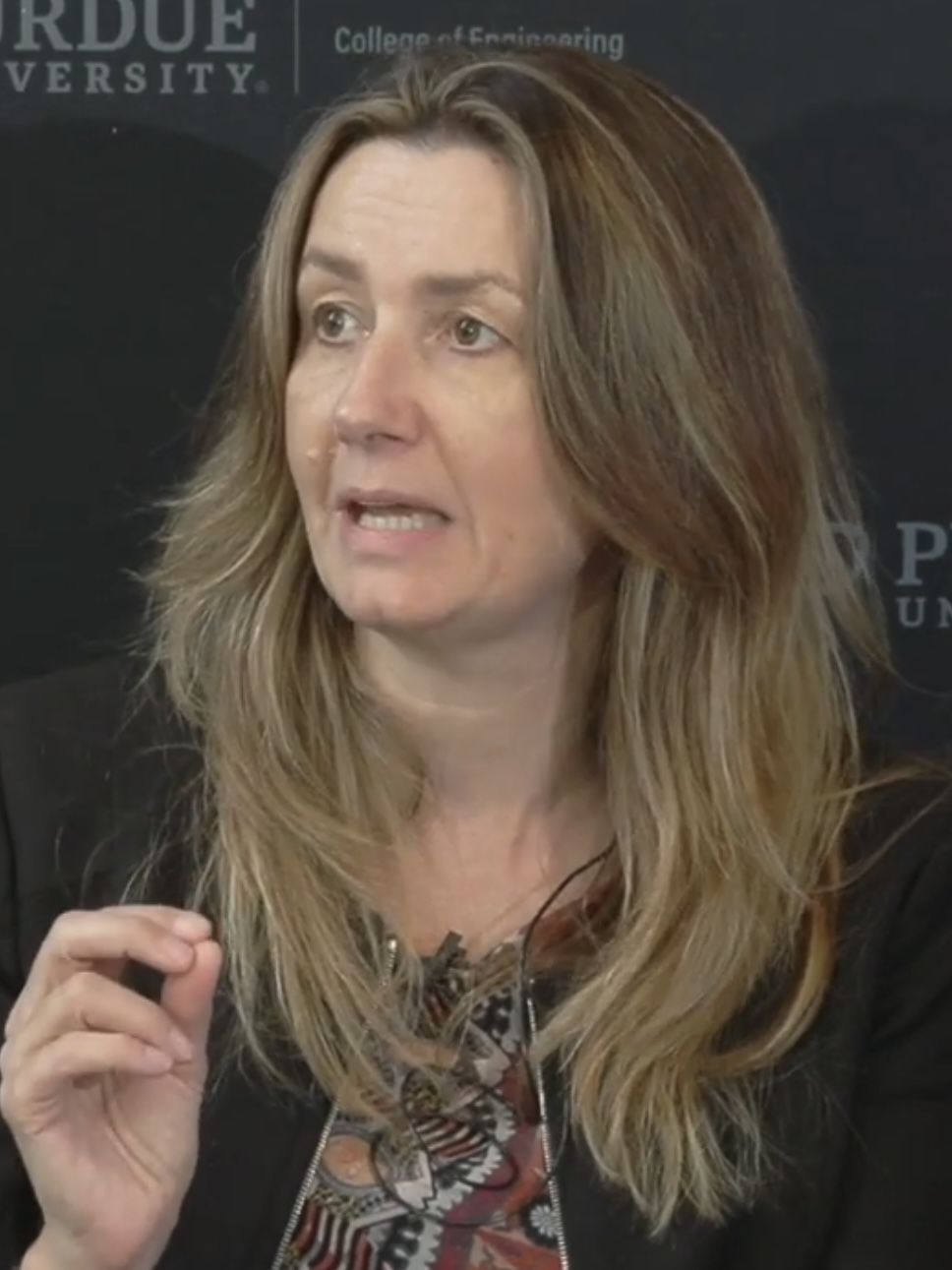
- Willcox in 2024
- Born: Auckland, New Zealand
- Education: University of Auckland; Massachusetts Institute of Technology
- Known for: Reduced-order modeling, multi-fidelity methods
- Scientific career
- Fields: Computational science; aerospace engineering
- Workplaces: Massachusetts Institute of Technology; University of Texas at Austin
- Thesis: Reduced-order aerodynamic models for aeroelastic control of turbomachines (2000)
- Doctoral advisor: Jaime Peraire; James Paduano

Karen Elizabeth Willcox MNZM is an aerospace engineer and computational scientist best known for her work on reduced-order modeling and the study of multi-fidelity methods. She is currently the director of the Oden Institute for Computational Engineering and Sciences and professor of Aerospace Engineering and Engineering Mechanics at the University of Texas at Austin, Texas.

== Personal life and education ==
Willcox was born and raised in New Zealand where she earned a bachelor's degree in Engineering Science from the University of Auckland in the year 1994. She subsequently moved to Boston, Massachusetts to join the Massachusetts Institute of Technology (MIT) for graduate studies. At MIT, she received a master's degree in Aeronautics and Astronautics in 1996 and a PhD in the same subject in the year 2000. Her thesis, titled 'Reduced-Order Aerodynamic Models for Aeroelastic Control of Turbomachines', was completed under the supervision of Jaime Peraire and James Paduano. While at MIT, Willcox played for the MIT Women's Rugby team. She is also an avid marathon-runner and an experienced mountain climber.

Willcox had long wanted to be an astronaut. She made the shortlist of candidates for NASA's astronaut training program in 2009 and 2013, but both attempts remained unsuccessful.

== Career ==
Following her doctoral studies, Willcox worked at Boeing Phantom Works in the Blended-Wing-Body aircraft design group for a year. In 2001, she joined the Department of Aeronautics and Astronautics at MIT as a professor. In 2008, she additionally became a founding co-director of the MIT Center for Computational Engineering. She stayed at MIT until July 2018. During this period, she also had short-term visiting appointments at Sandia National Laboratories, the University of Auckland and Singapore University of Technology and Design. In August 2018, Willcox joined the University of Texas at Austin to succeed J. Tinsley Oden as the director of the Institute for Computational Engineering and Sciences.

Willcox has served on the editorial board of several journals; she is currently a Section editor for the SIAM Journal on Scientific Computing and an Associate editor for the AIAA Journal and for Computing in Science & Engineering, an IEEE technical magazine.

In addition to research, Willcox is involved in science education and policy as well. An advocate for innovation in teaching, she served as co-chair of the Online Education Policy Initiative at MIT. Since 2014, she has served on the Advisory Board of Girls' Angle. In 2015, she received a First in the World grant from the US Department of Education.

== Recognition ==
Willcox was appointed a Member of the New Zealand Order of Merit, for services to aerospace engineering and education, in the 2017 Queen's Birthday Honours. She was elected as a fellow of the Society for Industrial and Applied Mathematics in 2018, "for contributions to model reduction and multifidelity methods, with applications in optimization, control, design, and uncertainty quantification of large-scale systems". She was elected as a Fellow of the American Institute of Aeronautics and Astronautics in 2019.
