= Omar Ghattas =

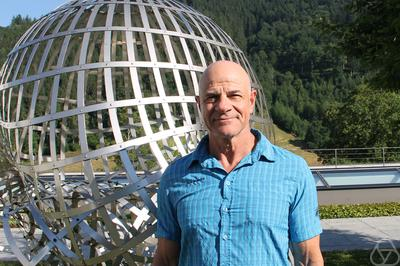
- Ghattas at Oberwolfach in 2026
- Education: Duke University
- Known for: PDE-constrained optimization
- Awards: Gordon Bell Prize (2003, 2015, 2025)
- Scientific career
- Fields: Computational mechanics Inverse problems Uncertainty quantification
- Workplaces: Carnegie Mellon University; University of Texas at Austin; Institute for Computational Engineering and Sciences
- Doctoral students: George Biros

Omar Ghattas is the John A. and Katherine G. Jackson Chair in Computational Geosciences and Professor of Mechanical Engineering and Geological Sciences at the University of Texas at Austin.

== Early life and career ==
Ghattas obtained a Ph.D. in computational mechanics from Duke University. He is the director of the Center for Computational Geosciences and Optimization at the Institute for Computational Engineering and Sciences.

Ghattas was trice awarded a Gordon Bell Prize that "recognizes outstanding achievement in high-performance computing applications". In 2019, Ghattas was awarded the SIAM Geosciences Career Prize for “groundbreaking contributions in analysis, methods, algorithms, and software for grand challenge computational problems in geosciences, and for exceptional influence as mentor, educator, and collaborator.”

== Awards ==
- Fellow of the Society for Industrial and Applied Mathematics (2014)
