= Biros =

Biros is a Hungarian surname:

- George Biros, Greek-American engineer
- Judith Biros Robson (born 1939), American nurse, nursing instructor, and politician
- Kenneth Biros (1958–2009), American convicted murderer
- Péter Biros (born 1976), Hungarian former water polo player

Biroš is a Slovak surname:

- Pavol Biroš (1953–2020), Czechoslovak football player
- Peter Biroš (1950–2024), Slovak politician and dental surgeon, brother of Pavol Biroš

== See also ==
- Biro
