= Yaoyao Fiona Zhao =

Chinese-Canadian mechanical engineer

Yaoyao Fiona Zhao is a Chinese and Canadian mechanical engineer who works at McGill University as a professor of mechanical engineering and William Dawson Scholar. Topics in her research include engineering design, additive manufacturing, and design for additive manufacturing.

== Education and career ==
Zhao received a bachelor's degree in engineering in 2003 from the Beijing Institute of Technology. She went to New Zealand for graduate study at the University of Auckland, where she received a master's degree in 2006 and completed her Ph.D. in 2010. Her doctoral dissertation was An Integrated Process Planning System for Machining and Inspection, supervised by Xun Xu.

Before taking a faculty position at McGill, she was a postdoctoral researcher at the National Institute of Standards and Technology in the US and the École centrale de Nantes in France.

== Recognition ==
Zhao was named as an ASME Fellow by the American Society of Mechanical Engineers in 2025.
