= DFM analysis for stereolithography =

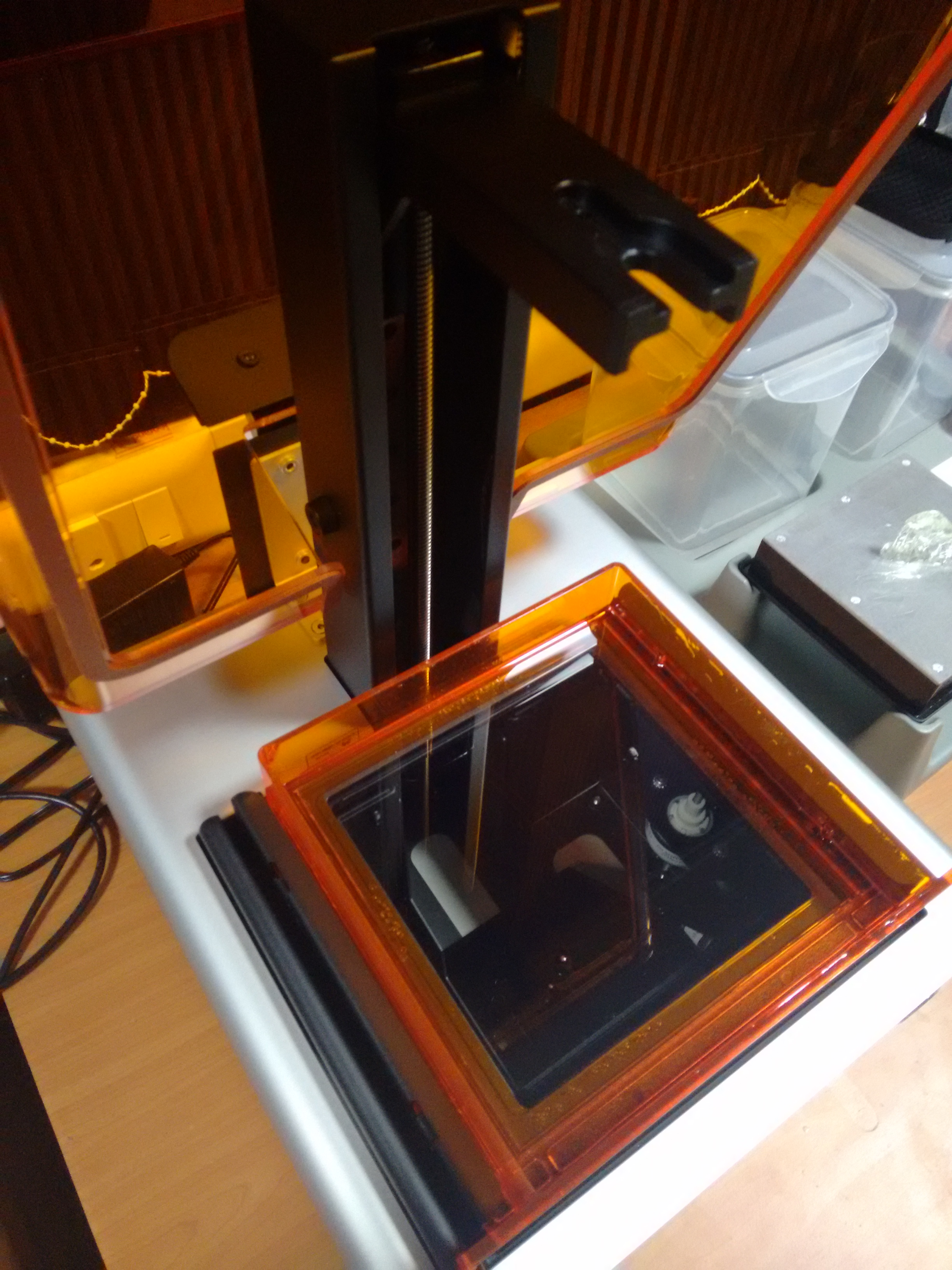
A desktop setup for Rapid prototyping by SLA process

In design for additive manufacturing (DFAM), there are both broad themes (which apply to many additive manufacturing processes) and optimizations specific to a particular AM process. Described here is DFM analysis for stereolithography, in which design for manufacturability (DFM) considerations are applied in designing a part (or assembly) to be manufactured by the stereolithography (SLA) process. In SLA, parts are built from a photocurable liquid resin that cures when exposed to a laser beam that scans across the surface of the resin (photopolymerization). Resins containing acrylate, epoxy, and urethane are typically used. Complex parts and assemblies can be directly made in one go, to a greater extent than in earlier forms of manufacturing such as casting, forming, metal fabrication, and machining. Realization of such a seamless process requires the designer to take in considerations of manufacturability of the part (or assembly) by the process. In any product design process, DFM considerations are important to reduce iterations, time and material wastage.

== Challenges in stereolithography ==
=== Material ===
Excessive setup specific material cost and lack of support for 3rd party resins is a major challenge with SLA process:. The choice of material (a design process) is restricted by the supported resin. Hence, the mechanical properties are also fixed. When scaling up dimensions selectively to deal with expected stresses, post curing is done by further treatment with UV light and heat. Although advantageous to mechanical properties, the additional polymerization and cross linkage can result in shrinkage, warping and residual thermal stresses. Hence, the part shall be designed in its 'green' stage i.e. pre-treatment stage.

=== Setup and process ===
SLA process is an additive manufacturing process. Hence, design considerations such as orientation, process latitude, support structures etc. have to be considered. Orientation affects the support structures, manufacturing time, part quality and part cost. Complex structures may fail to manufacture properly due to orientation which is not feasible resulting in undesirable stresses. This is when the DFM guidelines can be applied. Design feasibility for stereolithography can be validated by analytical as well as on the basis of simulation and/or guidelines

== Rule-based DFM considerations ==
Rule-based considerations in DFM refer to certain criteria that the part has to meet in order to avoid failures during manufacturing. Given the layer-by-layer manufacturing technique the process follows, there isn't any constraint on the overall complexity that the part may have. But some rules have been developed through experience by the printer developer/academia which must be followed to ensure that the individual features that make up the part are within certain 'limits of feasibility'.

=== Printer constraints ===
Constraints/limitations in SLA manufacturing come from the printer's accuracy, layer thickness, speed of curing, speed of printing etc. Various printer constraints are to be considered during design such as:

- Minimum Wall Thickness (Supported and Unsupported): Wall thickness in geometries is limited by resin resolution. Supported walls have ends connected to other walls. Below a thickness limit, such walls may warp during peeling. Unsupported walls are even more liable to detachment hence higher limit is for such case.
- Overhang (Maximum Unsupported Length and Minimum Unsupported Angle): Overhangs are geometric features that are not supported inherently in the part. These must be supported by support structures. There is a maximum limit when structures are not provided. This is to reduce bending under self-weight. Too shallow angles result in a longer unsupported (projected) length. Hence, a minimum limit on that.
- Maximum Bridge Span: To avoid sagging of beam-like structures that are supported only at the ends, the maximum span length of such structures shall be limited. Whenever this is not possible, width should be increased for compensation.
- Minimum Vertical pillar diameter: This is to ensure the slenderness is above a limit at which the feature becomes wavy.
- Minimum dimensions of grooves and embossed detail: Grooves are imprinted and emboss are shallow raised features on the part surface. Features printed with dimensions smaller than the limits are unrecognizable.
- Minimum Clearance between geometries: This is to ensure the parts don't fuse.
- Minimum hole diameter and radius of curvatures: Small curvatures that aren't realizable by print dimensions may close up or smooth out/fuse.
- Minimum internal volumes nominal diameters: Volumes that are too small may fill up.

=== Support structures ===
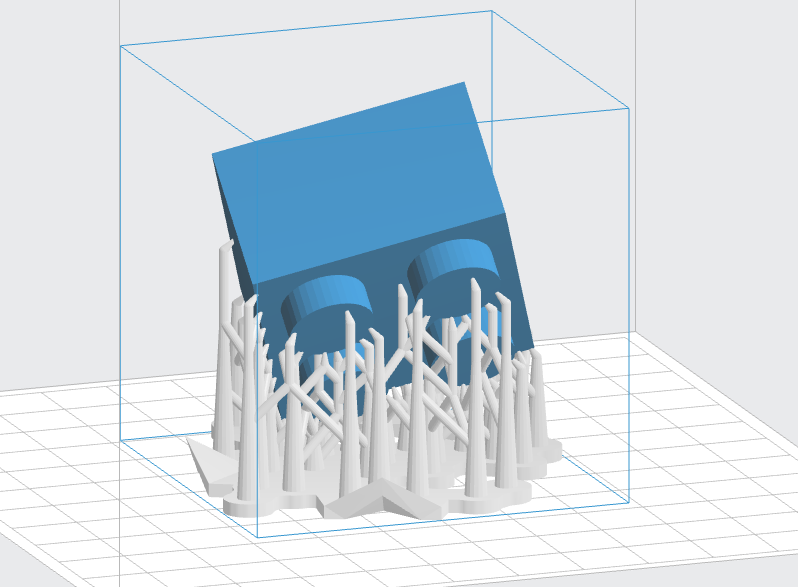
Graphic showing support structures for a lego block

A point needs support if:

- It is end point of support less edges
- If length of the overhang is more than a critical value
- It is at the geometric center of support less plane

While printing, support structures act as a part of design hence, their limitations and advantages are kept in mind while designing. Major considerations include:

- Support shallow angle geometry: Shallow angles may result in improper resin (structural strength issues) curing unless supports are provided uniformly. Generally, beyond a certain angle (usually around 45 degrees), the surface doesn't require support.
- Overhang base: Increase section thickness at base to avoid tearing. Avoid sharp transitions at overhang base.
- Air pocket releaf: Without supports, printing parts with a flat surface and holes in the geometry may create air bubbles. As the part prints, these air pockets can cause voids in the model. The support structures, in this case, create pathways through which the air bubbles could escape.
- Structure compatibility: Consider Supports compatibility for internal volume surface.
- Feature Orientation: Orient to ensure overhangs are well supported.

=== Part deposition orientation ===
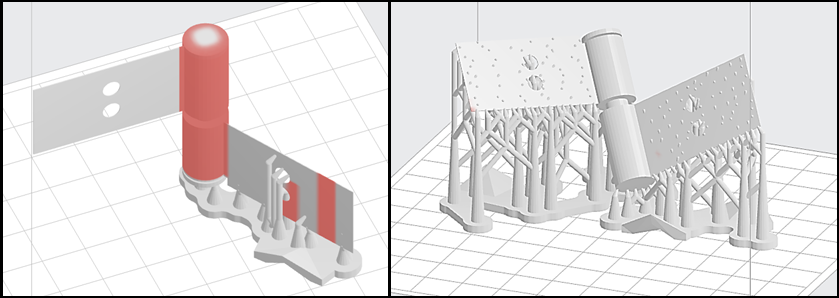
Significance of support structures and orientation in SLA process. The object, in first case, has strength issues and takes more time to manufacture than in the second case.

Part orientation is a very crucial decision in DFM analysis for SLA process. The build time, surface quality, volume/number of support structures etc. depend on this. In many cases, it is also possible to address the manufacturability issues just by reorienting the part. For example, an overhanging geometry with shallow angle may be oriented to ensure steep angles. Hence, major considerations include:

- Surface finish improvement: Orient the part in such a way that a feature on critical surface is eliminated. Algorithmic point of view, a free-form surface is decomposed to combination of various plane surfaces and weight is calculated/assigned to each. Total of weights is minimized for best overall surface finish.
- Build Time reduction: Rough estimation of build time is done using slicing. The build time is proportional to the sum of surface areas of each slice. (Can be approximated as height of the part)
- Support structure optimization: Supported area varies as per orientation. In some orientations, it is possible to reduce support area.
- Easy peel-off: Reorienting such that the projected area of layers varies gradually makes it easier to peel off the cured layer during printing. Orientation also helps in removal of the support structures at later stages.

== Plan-based DFM considerations ==
Plan-based considerations in DFM refer to criteria that arise due to process plan. These are to be met in order to avoid failures during manufacturing of a part that may satisfy the rule-based criteria but may have some manufacturing difficulties due to sequence in which features are produced.

=== Geometric tailoring ===
The modification of some non-critical geometric features of a part to lower fabrication cost and time, and to produce functional prototypes that mimic the behavior of the production parts.

Geometric Tailoring bridges the mismatch of material properties and process differences described above. Both functionality and manufacturability issues are addressed. Functionality issues are addressed through 'tailoring' of dimensions of the part to compensate the stress and deflection behavior anomalies. Manufacturability issues are tackled through identification of difficult to manufacture geometric attributes (an approach used in most DFM handbooks) or through simulations of manufacturing processes. For RP-produced parts (as in SLA), the problem formulations are called material-process geometric tailoring (MPGT)/RP. First, the designer specifies information such as: Parametric CAD model of the part; constraints and goals on functional, geometry, cost and time characteristics; analysis models for these constraints and goals; target values of goals; and preferences for the goals. DFM problem is then formulated as the designer fills in the MPGT template with this information and sends to the manufacturer, who fills in the remaining 'manufacturing relevant' information. With the completed formulation, the manufacturer is now able to solve the DFM problem, performing GT of the part design. Hence, the MPGT serves as the digital interface between the designer and the manufacturer. Various Process Planning (PP) strategies have been developed for geometric tailoring in SLA process.

=== DFM frameworks ===
The constraints imposed by the manufacturing process are mapped onto the design. This helps in identification of DFM problems while exploring process plans by acting as a retrieval method. Various DFM frameworks are developed in literature. These frameworks help in various decision making steps such as:

- Product-process fit: Ensuring consideration of manufacturing issues during the design stage gives insight on whether SLA process is the right choice. Rapid prototyping can be done in various ways. The usual concern are process cost and availability. Through this DFM Framework, the designer can make necessary design changes to ease the component manufacturability in SLA Process. This framework hence ensures that the product is suitable for the manufacturing plan.
- Feature recognition: This is done through integrated process planning tasks in commercial CAD/CAM software. This may include simulations of the manufacturing process to get an idea of the possible difficulties in a virtual manufacturing environment. Such integrated tools are in developmental stage.
- Functionality considerations: In some cases, assemblies are directly printed instead of printing parts separately and assembling. In such cases, phenomenon such as flow of the resin may affect the functionality drastically which may not be addressed through just rule based analysis. In fact, the rule based analysis is only to ensure the bounds of design but the dimensions of the final part must be checked for manufacturability through Plan-based consideration. Considerable research has been going on in this since the past decade. DFM frameworks are being developed and put into packages.

== See also ==
- Rapid prototyping
