= Adjoint state method =

Numerical method

The adjoint state method is a numerical method for efficiently computing the gradient of a function or operator in a numerical optimization problem. It has applications in geophysics, seismic imaging, photonics and more recently in neural networks.

The adjoint state space is chosen to simplify the physical interpretation of equation constraints.

Adjoint state techniques allow the use of integration by parts, resulting in a form which explicitly contains the physically interesting quantity. An adjoint state equation is introduced, including a new unknown variable.

The adjoint method formulates the gradient of a function towards its parameters in a constraint optimization form. By using the dual form of this constraint optimization problem, it can be used to calculate the gradient very fast. A nice property is that the number of computations is independent of the number of parameters for which you want the gradient. The adjoint method is derived from the dual problem and is used e.g. in the Landweber iteration method.

The name adjoint state method refers to the dual form of the problem, where the adjoint matrix $A^*=\overline A ^T$ is used.

When the initial problem consists of calculating the product $s^T x$ and $x$ must satisfy $Ax=b$, the dual problem can be realized as calculating the product $r^T b$ ($= s^T x$), where $r$ must satisfy $A^* r = s$. And $r$ is called the adjoint state vector.

== General case ==
The original adjoint calculation method goes back to Jean Céa, with the use of the Lagrangian of the optimization problem to compute the derivative of a functional with respect to a shape parameter.

For a state variable $u \in \mathcal{U}$, an optimization variable $v\in\mathcal{V}$, an objective functional $J:\mathcal{U}\times\mathcal{V}\to\mathbb{R}$ is defined. The state variable $u$ is often implicitly dependent on $v$ through the (direct) state equation $D_v(u)=0$ (usually the weak form of a partial differential equation), thus the considered objective is $j(v) = J(u_v,v)$, where $u_v$ is the solution of the state equation given the optimization variables $v$. Usually, one would be interested in calculating $\nabla j(v)$ using the chain rule:

$$\nabla j(v) = \nabla_v J(u_v,v) + \nabla_u J(u_v,v)\nabla_v u_v.$$

Unfortunately, the term $\nabla_v u_v$ is often very hard to differentiate analytically since the dependence is defined through an implicit equation. The Lagrangian functional can be used as a workaround for this issue. Since the state equation can be considered as a constraint in the minimization of $j$, the problem

$$\text{minimize}\ j(v) = J(u_v,v)$$
$$\text{subject to}\ D_v(u_v) = 0$$

has an associate Lagrangian functional $\mathcal{L}:\mathcal{U}\times\mathcal{V}\times\mathcal{U} \to \mathbb{R}$ defined by

$$\mathcal{L}(u,v,\lambda) = J(u,v) + \langle D_v(u),\lambda\rangle,$$

where $\lambda\in\mathcal{U}$ is a Lagrange multiplier or adjoint state variable and $\langle\cdot,\cdot\rangle$ is an inner product on $\mathcal{U}$. The method of Lagrange multipliers states that a solution to the problem has to be a stationary point of the lagrangian, namely

$$\begin{cases}
d_u\mathcal{L}(u,v,\lambda;\delta_u) = d_uJ(u,v;\delta_u) + \langle \delta_u,D_v^*(\lambda)\rangle = 0 & \forall \delta_u \in \mathcal{U},\\
d_v\mathcal{L}(u,v,\lambda;\delta_v) = d_vJ(u,v;\delta_v) + \langle d_vD_v(u;\delta_v),\lambda\rangle = 0 & \forall \delta_v\in\mathcal{V},\\
d_\lambda\mathcal{L}(u,v,\lambda;\delta_\lambda) = \langle D_v(u), \delta_\lambda\rangle = 0 \quad & \forall \delta_\lambda \in \mathcal{U},
\end{cases}$$

where $d_xF(x;\delta_x)$ is the Gateaux derivative of $F$ with respect to $x$ in the direction $\delta_x$. The last equation is equivalent to $D_v(u) = 0$, the state equation, to which the solution is $u_v$. The first equation is the so-called adjoint state equation,

$$\langle \delta_u,D_v^*(\lambda)\rangle = -d_uJ(u_v,v;\delta_u) \quad \forall \delta_u \in \mathcal{U},$$

because the operator involved is the adjoint operator of $D_v$, $D_v^*$. Resolving this equation yields the adjoint state $\lambda_v$. The gradient of the quantity of interest $j$ with respect to $v$ is $\langle \nabla j(v),\delta_v\rangle = d_v j(v;\delta_v) = d_v \mathcal{L}(u_v,v,\lambda_v;\delta_v)$ (the second equation with $u=u_v$ and $\lambda=\lambda_v$), thus it can be easily identified by subsequently resolving the direct and adjoint state equations. The process is even simpler when the operator $D_v$ is self-adjoint or symmetric since the direct and adjoint state equations differ only by their right-hand side.

== Example: Linear case ==
In a real finite dimensional linear programming context, the objective function could be $J(u,v) = \langle Au , v \rangle$, for $v\in\mathbb{R}^n$, $u\in\mathbb{R}^m$ and $A \in \mathbb{R}^{n\times m}$, and let the state equation be $B_vu = b$, with $B_v \in \mathbb{R}^{m\times m}$ and $b\in \mathbb{R}^m$.

The Lagrangian function of the problem is $\mathcal{L}(u,v,\lambda) = \langle Au,v\rangle + \langle B_vu - b,\lambda\rangle$, where $\lambda\in\mathbb{R}^m$.

The derivative of $\mathcal{L}$ with respect to $\lambda$ yields the state equation as shown before, and the state variable is $u_v = B_v^{-1}b$. The derivative of $\mathcal{L}$ with respect to $u$ is equivalent to the adjoint equation, which is, for every $\delta_u \in \mathbb{R}^m$,

$$d_u[\langle B_v\cdot- b, \lambda\rangle](u;\delta_u)= - \langle A^\top v,\delta u\rangle \iff \langle B_v \delta_u,\lambda\rangle = - \langle A^\top v,\delta u\rangle \iff \langle B_v^\top \lambda +  A^\top v,\delta_u\rangle = 0 \iff B_v^\top \lambda = - A^\top v.$$

Thus, we can write symbolically $\lambda_v = - B_v^{-\top}A^\top v$. The gradient would be

$$\langle \nabla j(v),\delta_v\rangle = \langle Au_v,\delta_v\rangle + \langle \nabla_vB_v : \lambda_v\otimes u_v,\delta_v\rangle,$$

where $\nabla_v B_v = \frac{\partial B_{ij}}{\partial v_k}$ is a third-order tensor, $\lambda_v \otimes u_v = \lambda^\top_v u_v$ is the dyadic product between the direct and adjoint states and $:$ denotes a double tensor contraction. It is assumed that $B_v$ has a known analytic expression that can be differentiated easily.

=== Numerical consideration for the self-adjoint case ===
If the operator $B_v$ was self-adjoint, $B_v = B_v^\top$, the direct state equation and the adjoint state equation would have the same left-hand side. In the goal of never inverting a matrix, which is a very slow process numerically, a LU decomposition can be used instead to solve the state equation, in $O(m^3)$ operations for the decomposition and $O(m^2)$ operations for the resolution. That same decomposition can then be used to solve the adjoint state equation in only $O(m^2)$ operations since the matrices are the same.

== See also ==
- Adjoint equation
- Backpropagation
- Method of Lagrange multipliers
- Shape optimization
