= Feliciano Giustino =

Italian physicist and materials scientist

- Education: Politecnico di Torino (MSc, 2001); École Polytechnique Fédérale de Lausanne (PhD, 2005)
- Known for: First-principles theory of electron–phonon interactions; EPW electron–phonon code (Quantum ESPRESSO); Research on halide perovskites and polarons
- Awards: Guggenheim Fellowship (Physics, 2025); Fellow of the American Physical Society (2020); Leverhulme Research Leadership Award (2012); European Research Council Starting Grant (2009)
- Scientific career
- Fields: Condensed matter physics; Computational physics; Materials science
- Workplaces: University of Texas at Austin; University of Oxford; University of California, Berkeley
- Website: cqme.org

Feliciano Giustino is an Italian physicist and materials scientist who works in computational condensed matter physics. He is a professor of physics at the University of Texas at Austin, where he holds the W. A. "Tex" Moncrief, Jr. Chair in Quantum Materials Engineering and directs the Center for Quantum Materials Engineering at the Oden Institute for Computational Engineering and Sciences.

Giustino's work includes first-principles theory and software for electron–phonon interactions, including development of the EPW code distributed with Quantum ESPRESSO, and studies of halide perovskite semiconductors. He authored the textbook Materials Modelling Using Density Functional Theory: Properties and Predictions (2014) and the review article "Electron–phonon interactions from first principles" in Reviews of Modern Physics (2017). He was elected a Fellow of the American Physical Society in 2020 and was named a 2025 Guggenheim Fellow in physics.

== Early life and education ==
Giustino earned an MSc degree in nuclear engineering from the Politecnico di Torino in 2001 and a PhD in physics from the École Polytechnique Fédérale de Lausanne (EPFL) in 2005. During 2000–2001 he was a research fellow in the Experimental Physics Division at CERN in Geneva, Switzerland. After completing his doctorate he carried out postdoctoral research at the University of California, Berkeley and at Lawrence Berkeley National Laboratory (2005–2008).

== Academic career ==
In 2008 Giustino joined the Department of Materials at the University of Oxford as University Lecturer in materials modeling and became a Governing Body Fellow of Wolfson College. He was promoted to associate professor in 2013 and to professor of materials in 2014. In 2012 he received a Leverhulme Research Leadership Award for research on biomimetic solar cells.

In 2017–2018 he held the Mary Shepard B. Upson Visiting Professorship in Engineering at Cornell University. He joined the University of Texas at Austin in 2019.

== Research ==
Giustino's research focuses on first-principles electronic structure theory and high-performance computing for materials, including calculations of electron–phonon interactions and studies of halide perovskite semiconductors.

=== Electron–phonon interactions and EPW ===
Giustino's 2017 review article in Reviews of Modern Physics, "Electron–phonon interactions from first principles", surveys theoretical and computational approaches for ab initio calculations of electron–phonon couplings and applications to superconductivity, transport, and optical spectroscopy.

He co-developed the EPW code (Electron–Phonon coupling using Wannier functions), distributed as part of the Quantum ESPRESSO package.

=== Halide perovskites ===
Giustino has worked on the theory of halide perovskite semiconductors for solar cells and light-emitting devices. In a 2016 perspective article in ACS Energy Letters, co-authored with Henry J. Snaith, he discussed strategies for replacing lead in perovskite solar absorbers and surveyed candidate lead-free materials.

=== Topological polarons ===
In 2024 Giustino and collaborators reported topological polarons in halide perovskites using first-principles simulations.

== Awards and honors ==
- 2009 – European Research Council Starting Grant (project ALIGN, University of Oxford).
- 2012 – Leverhulme Research Leadership Award.
- 2020 – Elected Fellow of the American Physical Society (Division of Computational Physics).
- 2025 – Guggenheim Fellowship in Physics (Centennial Class).

== Selected publications ==
- F. Giustino, "Electron–phonon interactions from first principles", Reviews of Modern Physics 89 (2017) 015003.
- J. Noffsinger et al., "EPW: A program for calculating the electron–phonon coupling using maximally localized Wannier functions", Computer Physics Communications 181 (2010) 2140–2148.
- H. J. Snaith and F. Giustino, "Toward lead-free perovskite solar cells", ACS Energy Letters 1 (2016) 1233–1240.
- J. Lafuente-Bartolome, C. Lian and F. Giustino, "Topological polarons in halide perovskites", Proceedings of the National Academy of Sciences of the United States of America 121 (2024) e2318151121.

== Books ==
- F. Giustino, Materials Modelling Using Density Functional Theory: Properties and Predictions (Oxford University Press, 2014).
