= Irene M. Gamba =

Argentine-American mathematician

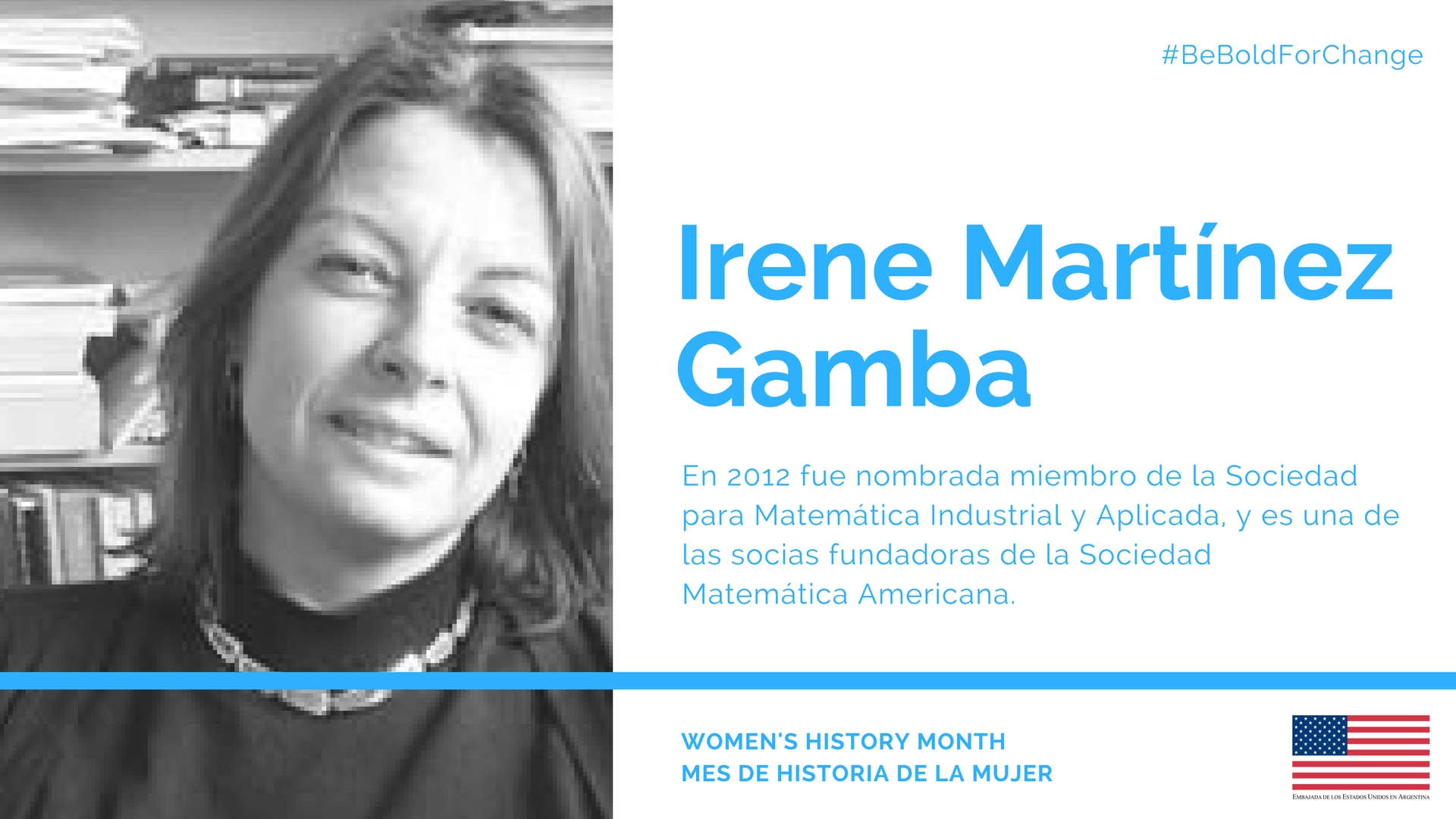
Irene Martinez Gamba

Irene Martínez Gamba (born 1957) is an Argentine–American mathematician. She works as a professor of mathematics at the University of Texas at Austin, where she holds the W.A. Tex Moncrief, Jr. Chair in Computational Engineering and Sciences and is head of the Applied Mathematics Group in the Oden Institute for Computational Engineering and Sciences.

== Education and career ==
Gamba graduated from the University of Buenos Aires in 1981. She went to the University of Chicago for her graduate studies, earning a master's degree in 1985 and a Ph.D. in 1989, under the supervision of Jim Douglas, Jr.

After postdoctoral studies at Purdue University and the Courant Institute of Mathematical Sciences of New York University, she became an assistant professor at NYU in 1994 and associate professor in 1996. She became a professor at the University of Texas at Austin in 1997. At the University of Texas, she was the Joe B. and Louise Cook Professor from 2007 to 2013, the John T. Stuart III Centennial Professor from 2013 to 2014, and the W.A. Tex Moncreif, Jr. Chair in Computational Sciences and Engineering III since 2014.

== Recognition ==
In 2012, Gamba became a fellow of the Society for Industrial and Applied Mathematics, and one of the inaugural fellows of the American Mathematical Society. The Association for Women in Mathematics selected her as their 2014 Sonia Kovalevsky Lecturer. She is also a former AMS Council Member at large.
