= Infinite-dimensional optimization =

In certain optimization problems the unknown optimal solution might not be a number or a vector, but rather a continuous quantity, for example a function or the shape of a body. Such a problem is an infinite-dimensional optimization problem, because, a continuous quantity cannot be determined by a finite number of certain degrees of freedom.

== Examples ==
- Find the shortest path between two points in a plane. The variables in this problem are the curves connecting the two points. The optimal solution is of course the line segment joining the points, if the metric defined on the plane is the Euclidean metric.
- Given two cities in a country with many hills and valleys, find the shortest road going from one city to the other. This problem is a generalization of the above, and the solution is not as obvious.
- Given two circles which will serve as top and bottom for a cup of given height, find the shape of the side wall of the cup so that the side wall has minimal area. The intuition would suggest that the cup must have conical or cylindrical shape, which is false. The actual minimum surface is the catenoid.
- Find the shape of a bridge capable of sustaining given amount of traffic using the smallest amount of material.
- Find the shape of an airplane which bounces away most of the radio waves from an enemy radar.

Infinite-dimensional optimization problems can be more challenging than finite-dimensional ones. Typically one needs to employ methods from partial differential equations to solve such problems.

Several disciplines which study infinite-dimensional optimization problems are calculus of variations, optimal control and shape optimization.

== See also ==
- Semi-infinite programming
