= Design for additive manufacturing =

Designing products to facilitate 3D printing

Design for additive manufacturing (DfAM or DFAM) is design for manufacturability as applied to additive manufacturing (AM). It is a general type of design methods or tools whereby functional performance and/or other key product life-cycle considerations such as manufacturability, reliability, and cost can be optimized subject to the capabilities of additive manufacturing technologies.

This concept emerges due to the enormous design freedom provided by AM technologies. To take full advantages of unique capabilities from AM processes, DfAM methods or tools are needed. Typical DfAM methods or tools include topology optimization, design for multiscale structures (lattice or cellular structures), multi-material design, mass customization, part consolidation, and other design methods which can make use of AM-enabled features.

DfAM is not always separate from broader DFM, as the making of many objects can involve both additive and subtractive steps. Nonetheless, the name "DfAM" has value because it focuses attention on the way that commercializing AM in production roles is not just a matter of figuring out how to switch existing parts from subtractive to additive. Rather, it is about redesigning entire objects (assemblies, subsystems) in view of the newfound availability of advanced AM. That is, it involves redesigning them because their entire earlier design—including even how, why, and at which places they were originally divided into discrete parts—was conceived within the constraints of a world where advanced AM did not yet exist. Thus instead of just modifying an existing part design to allow it to be made additively, full-fledged DfAM involves things like reimagining the overall object such that it has fewer parts or a new set of parts with substantially different boundaries and connections. The object thus may no longer be an assembly at all, or it may be an assembly with many fewer parts. Many examples of such deep-rooted practical impact of DfAM have been emerging in the 2010s, as AM greatly broadens its commercialization. For example, in 2017, GE Aviation revealed that it had used DfAM to create a helicopter engine with 16 parts instead of 900, with great potential impact on reducing the complexity of supply chains. It is this radical rethinking aspect that has led to themes such as that "DfAM requires 'enterprise-level disruption'." In other words, the disruptive innovation that AM can allow can logically extend throughout the enterprise and its supply chain, not just change the layout on a machine shop floor.

DfAM involves both broad themes (which apply to many AM processes) and optimizations specific to a particular AM process. For example, DFM analysis for stereolithography maximizes DfAM for that modality.

== Background ==
Additive manufacturing is defined as a material joining process, whereby a product can be directly fabricated from its 3D model, usually layer upon layer. Traditional manufacturing technologies such as CNC machining are a subtractive manufacturing process which removes material. Another method like casting which puts material into a certain form requires molds designed for that material. AM processes allow for generally less waste since it isn't subtractive while also not needing molds. AM processes like powder bed fusion, vat polymerization material extrusion enables the fabrication of parts with a complex geometry as well as achieving varied material distribution either through density or type of material.

DfAM exists due to new workflows derived from AM processes which introduce both new design freedoms and limitations. Multi-material printing, generative design, and in-situ monitoring on one hand bring more diversity for manufacturing but come with their own challenges. Other unique design capabilities like internal channels for cooling, lattice structures, and part consolidation need consideration depending on the material used or the time-cost effectiveness of the process. However layer by layer construction introduces needs like elaborate support structure requirements, surface finish limitations, and anisotropy. Traditional Design for manufacturing (DFM) rules or guidelines are built off of traditional manufacturing methods and don't take advantage of the new possibilities provided by AM. Moreover, traditional feature-based CAD tools aren't built with the intention of expressing irregular geometry which is possible for AM. These design methods or tools can be categorized as Design for Additive Manufacturing.

== Methods ==
=== Topology optimization ===
Topology optimization is a type of structural optimization technique which can optimize material layout within a given design space. Compared to other typical structural optimization techniques, such as size optimization or shape optimization, topology optimization improves efficiency for material usage in a part. In addition to this the complex optimized shapes obtained from topology optimization can handle complex interior geometries which take more resources to handle for traditional manufacturing processes like CNC machining. To address this issue, additive manufacturing can be used to fabricate these topology-optimized parts. A factor of topology optimization comes from manufacturing constraints. Small feature sizes also need to be considered as they can either prove as weak points in the manufacturing process and an obstacle during the topology optimization process. Achieving optimal geometry and slicing for additive manufacturing, balancing production quality with efficiency, is also aided by machine learning and generative AI techniques, including multimodal approaches.

=== Multiscale structure design ===
Due to the unique capabilities of AM processes, parts with multiscale complexities can be realized. This provides a great design freedom for designers to use cellular structures or lattice structures on micro or meso-scales for the preferred properties. For example, in the aerospace field, lattice structures fabricated by AM process can be used for weight reduction. In the bio-medical field, bio-implant made of lattice or cellular structures can enhance osseointegration.

=== Multi-material design ===
Parts with multi-material or complex material distribution can be achieved by additive manufacturing processes. To help designers take advantage of this capability, several design and simulation methods have been proposed to support the design of a part with multiple materials or Functionally Graded Materials . These design methods also bring a challenge to traditional CAD system. Most of them can only deal with homogeneous materials now.

=== Design for mass customization ===
Since additive manufacturing can directly fabricate parts from products’ digital model, it significantly reduces the cost and leading time of producing customized products. Thus, how to rapidly generate customized parts becomes a central issue for mass customization. Several design methods have been proposed to help designers or users to obtain the customized product in an easy way. These methods or tools can also be considered as the DfAM methods.

=== Parts consolidation ===
Due to the constraints of traditional manufacturing methods, some complex components are usually separated into several parts for the ease of manufacturing as well as assembly. This situation has been changed by the use of additive manufacturing technologies. Some case studies have been done to show some parts in the original design can be consolidated into one complex part and fabricated by additive manufacturing processes. This redesigning process can be called as parts consolidation. The research shows parts consolidation will not only reduce part count, it can also improve the product functional performance. The design methods which can guide designers to do part consolidation can also be regarded as a type of DfAM methods.

=== Lattice structures ===
Lattice structures is a type of cellular structures (i.e. open). These structures were previously difficult to manufacture, hence was not widely used. Thanks to the free-form manufacturing capability of additive manufacturing technology, it is now possible to design and manufacture complex forms. Lattice structures have high strength and low mass mechanical properties and multifunctionality. These structures can be found in parts in the aerospace and biomedical industries. It has been observed that these lattice structures mimic atomic crystal lattice, where the nodes and struts represent atoms and atomic bonds, respectively, and termed as meta-crystals. They obey the metallurgical hardening principles (grain boundary strengthening, precipitate hardening etc.) when undergoing deformation. It has been further reported that the yield strength and ductility of the struts (meta-atomic bonds) can be increased drastically by taking advantage of the non-equilibrium solidification phenomenon in Additive Manufacturing, thus increasing the performance of the bulk structures.

=== Thermal issues in design ===
For AM processes that use heat to fuse powder or feedstock, process consistency and part quality are strongly influenced by the temperature history inside the part during manufacture, especially for metal AM. Thermal modelling can be used to inform part design and the choice of process parameters for manufacture, in place of expensive empirical testing.

== Optimal design for additive manufacturing ==
Additively manufactured metallic structures with the same (macroscopic) shape and size but fabricated by different process parameters have strikingly different microstructures and hence mechanical properties. The abundant and highly flexible AM process parameters substantially influence the AM microstructures. Therefore, in principle, one could simultaneously 3D-print the (macro-)structure as well as the desirable microstructure depending on the expected performance of the specialized AM component under the known service load. In this context, multi-scale and multi-physics integrated computational materials engineering (ICME) for computational linkage of process-(micro)structure-properties-performance (PSPP) chain can be used to efficiently search an AM design subspace for the optimum point with respect to the performance of the AM structure under the known service load. The comprehensive design space of metal AM is boundless and high dimensional, which includes all the possible combinations of alloy compositions, process parameters and structural geometries. However, always a constrained subset of the design space (design subspace) is under consideration. The performance, as the design objective, depending on the thermo-chemo-mechanical service load, may include multiple functional aspects, such as specific energy absorption capacity, fatigue life/strength, high temperature strength, creep resistance, erosion/wear resistance and/or corrosion resistance. It is hypothesized that the optimal design approach is essential for unraveling the full potential of metal AM technologies and thus their widespread adoption for production of structurally critical load-bearing components.

== See also ==
- List of 3D printing software
