= Oden Institute for Computational Engineering and Sciences =

Research unit at the University of Texas at Austin

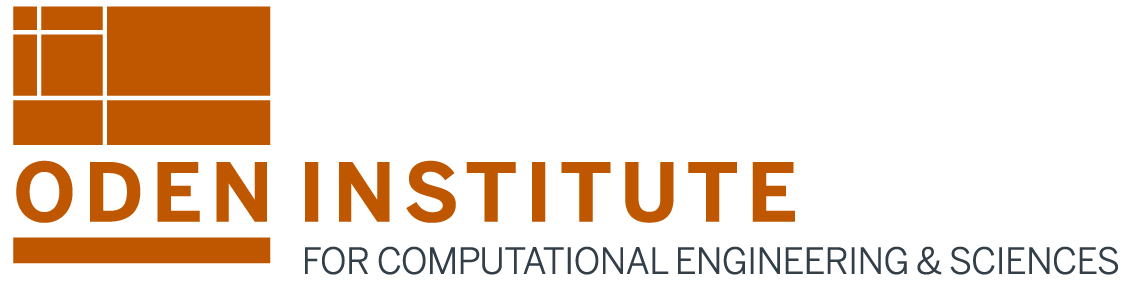
The Oden Institute logo

The Oden Institute for Computational Engineering and Sciences is an interdisciplinary research unit and graduate program at The University of Texas at Austin dedicated to advancing computational science and engineering through a variety of programs and research centers. The Institute currently supports 16 research centers, seven research groups and maintains the Computational Sciences, Engineering and Mathematics Program, a graduate degree program leading to the M.S. and Ph.D. degrees in Computational Science, Engineering and Mathematics. The interdisciplinary programs underway at the Oden Institute involve 123 faculty representing 23 academic departments and five schools and colleges. Oden Institute faculty hold positions in the Cockrell School of Engineering, College of Natural Sciences, Jackson School of Geosciences, Dell Medical School and McCombs School of Business. The Institute also supports the Peter O'Donnell, Jr. Postdoctoral Fellowship program and a program for visiting scholars through the J. Tinsley Oden Faculty Fellowship Research Fund. Organizationally, the Oden Institute reports to the Vice President for Research.

== Research centers and groups ==
The Oden Institute supports 23 research centers and research groups. Each center and group is organized around a research topic and is directed by an Oden Institute faculty member.

- Applied Mathematics Group
- Autonomous Systems Group
- Center for Computational Astronautical Sciences and Technologies (CAST)
- Center for Computational GeoSciences and Optimization
- Center for Computational Life Sciences and Biology
- Center for Computational Materials
- Center for Computational Molecular Science
- Center for Computational Oncology
- Center for Distributed and Grid Computing
- Center for Numerical Analysis
- Center for Predictive Engineering and Computational Science
- Center for Quantum Materials Engineering
- Center for Scientific Machine Learning
- Center for Subsurface Modeling
- Computational Hydraulics Group
- Computational Mechanics Group
- Computational Research in Ice and Ocean Systems
- Computational Visualization Center
- Electromagnetics and Acoustics Group
- Parallel Algorithms for Data Analysis and Simulation Group
- Probabilistic and High Order Inference, Computation, Estimation and Simulation
- Science of High-Performance Computing Group
- Willerson Center for Cardiovascular Modeling and Simulation

== Programs ==
The Oden Institute supports seven major programs that seek to promote computational science at various levels.

- The Computational Sciences, Engineering and Mathematics Program (CSEM)

A graduate program for MS and PhD students

- Peter O'Donnell, Jr. Postdoctoral Fellowship Program

Supports the research of recent doctorates

- J. Tinsley Oden Faculty Fellowship Research Program

Brings researchers and scholars from academia, government and industry to the institute to collaborate with Oden Institute researchers

- Moncrief Endowed Position

Used to support outstanding junior faculty

- Moncrief Grand Challenge Awards Program

Provides funding and resources for University of Texas at Austin faculty who work on challenges that affect national competitiveness

- The Moncrief Undergraduate Summer Internship Program

Supports undergraduate interns who work with ICES faculty during the summer

- Undergraduate certificate program

Allows junior and senior level students at The University of Texas at Austin the opportunity to study computational engineering and sciences, and have their studies recognized with a certificate.

== Notable faculty ==
- Ivo Babuška
- Chandrajit Bajaj
- George Biros
- Luis Caffarelli
- James R. Chelikowsky
- Clint Dawson
- Leszek F. Demkowicz
- Bjorn Engquist
- Irene M. Gamba
- Omar Ghattas
- Feliciano Giustino
- Patrick Heimbach
- Thomas J.R. Hughes
- Moriba K. Jah
- Dima Kozakov
- Per-Gunnar Martinsson
- Robert Moser
- J. Tinsley Oden
- Stella Offner
- Keshav Pingali
- William H. Press
- Michael S. Sacks
- Charles Taylor
- Ufuk Topcu
- Rachel Ward
- Mary Wheeler
- Karen Willcox
- Thomas Yankeelov
