= Robert Moser (engineer) =

American engineering academic

Robert D. Moser
- Born: 1956 (age 69–70); United States
- Education: MIT; Stanford University
- Known for: fluid dynamics, turbulent flows, Uncertainty Quantification
- Awards: NASA Medal for Exceptional Scientific Achievement (1995)
- Scientific career
- Fields: Mechanical engineering, computational science
- Workplaces: NASA Ames, UIUC, University of Texas
- Doctoral advisor: Parviz Moin

Robert D. Moser is an American Professor of engineering, noted for his studies of spectral methods, turbulence, and uncertainty quantification. He is the W. A. “Tex” Moncrief Jr. Chair in Computational Engineering and Sciences and is professor of mechanical engineering in thermal fluid systems at the University of Texas at Austin. Before coming to The University of Texas at Austin, he was a research scientist at the NASA-Ames Research Center and then a professor of theoretical and applied mechanics at the University of Illinois.

In 2009, he was appointed deputy director of the PECOS center (Center for Predictive Engineering and Computational Sciences) at the University of Texas. Currently he is the director of PECOS and the deputy director of the Oden Institute for Computational Engineering and Sciences.

He received his undergraduate degree from MIT and his Ph.D. under Parviz Moin in 1984 from Stanford University. He is a recipient of the NASA Medal for Exceptional Scientific Achievement. He is a fellow of the American Physical Society.
