= Robert Moser (business executive) =

American real estate investor and business executive

Robert J. Moser
- Education: Union College (B.S., 1999)
- Occupations: Business executive; real estate investor
- Organization(s): Prime Group Holdings; Prime Storage Personal estimated Net Worth in excess of $3 billion
- Title: Founder, owner, principal and CEO, Prime Group Holdings
- Board member of: Trustee, Union College
- Spouse: Lisa Moser
- Children: 2
- Website: goprimegroup.com primestorage.com

Robert J. Moser is an American business executive and real estate investor. He is the founder, owner, principal and chief executive officer of Prime Group Holdings, a Saratoga Springs, New York–based private equity real estate firm best known for investing in self‑storage assets under the Prime Storage brand. In 2023 the firm closed its third flagship fund at $2.5 billion—reported at the time as the largest dedicated self‑storage fund on record—and by 2024 said it managed well over $10 billion for a global institutional base.

== Early life and education ==
Moser earned a B.S. from Union College in 1999. He was elected to the Union College Board of Trustees in 2018.

== Career ==
Moser founded Prime Group Holdings in 2013 in Saratoga Springs, New York, to pursue a consolidation strategy in self‑storage real estate through the Prime Storage platform. The company has since expanded across the United States and Canada, including portfolio acquisitions totaling roughly 1.7 million square feet in 2024.

In January 2023, Prime Group closed Prime Storage Fund III, LP with $2.5 billion of commitments, described by trade and business outlets as the largest dedicated self‑storage fund raised to date.

== Philanthropy ==
Moser and his family have supported regional health care initiatives in Upstate New York. In 2017–2018, the family donated $5 million to Albany Medical Center to help fund a pediatric emergency department and support the Cleft‑Craniofacial Center.

== Personal life ==
Moser is based in Saratoga Springs, New York. He is married to Lisa Moser, a co‑owner and executive at Prime Group Holdings; they have two children.
