= Wing-shape optimization =

Wing-shape optimization is a software implementation of shape optimization primarily used for aircraft design. This allows for engineers to produce more efficient and cheaper aircraft designs.

== History ==
Shape optimization, as a software process and tool, first appeared as an algorithm in 1995 and as commercial software for the automotive industry by 1998, as noted by F. Muyl. Relative to the age of the automotive and aeronautical companies, this software is very new. The difficulty was not with the science behind the process, but rather the capabilities of computer hardware. In 1998, F. Muyl developed a compromise between exact accuracy and computational time to reduce drag of an automotive. GA phases are the standard genetic algorithm iterations and the BFGS phases are the approximated calculations designed to save time. However, he acknowledged that the computational time required on existing hardware, nearly two weeks for a moderate improvement on an oversimplified proof of concept model, made it unattractive for commercial purposes. He also recognized that improving the modeling implementation to use automatic partial derivatives might improve the computational time, particularly with specialized hardware. In 2000, after a couple years of computer hardware development, K. Maute introduced a more accurate system that could optimize an aircraft wing quickly enough for commercial use.

== Method ==
Wing-shape optimization is by nature an iterative process. First, a baseline wing design is chosen to begin the process with; this is usually the wing created by aerospace engineers. This wing is assumed to be reasonably close to a best-fit design from the engineers. The next step is to model the wing shape and structure. Once those are mapped out, the software flies the model in a simulated air tunnel using well-developed computational fluid dynamics (CFD) equations. The results of the test give the various performance characteristics of that design. Once that completes, the software makes incremental changes to the structure and shape details, recreates the model, and flies the new model through a wind tunnel. If the changes result in a better performing wing, then the software commits the changes. If not, the changes are thrown out and different changes are made. The changes are then saved as the new working model and the cycle will loop. This entire process is run until the changes observed appear to converge on a design – such as when the changes are under 1 mm.

Unfortunately, the resulting wing design can only be as good as the computational model.

== Examples ==
=== Traditional ===
An example of an optimization proof of concept was done in 2003 by Leoviriyakit using the Boeing 747-200. Using the variable list above, he optimized for only a single point – a lift coefficient of 0.42 and a speed of Mach 0.87, just above cruising. With just those few variables, he was able to realize a 12% decrease in drag and a 0.1% decrease in wing weight. The code that was run produced a longer span but less sweep-back than the original wing planform. While the reduction in sweep-back actually increases drag it also increases lift allowing a lower AoA and the extended wing span decreases the induced drag (wing tip vortex) resulting in a net reduction of drag. Unfortunately, his optimized design uses too simple of a model; he realized that had more variables, such as viscous effects, been taken into consideration, the resulting model would have been far different. The other major limitation of the single point approach is that it only optimizes the wing for one speed and lift condition. While the drag may have been reduced at cruising speed, it might have been drastically increased for take-off and landing, resulting in a net fuel loss for the airline.

=== Wing-body ===
This process can also be extended to explore single wing-body aircraft designs. Wing-body styled aircraft can scale up their cargo much easier than the traditional ‘tube and plank’ design. Airbus utilized this approach to explore design choices in future large aircraft in 2002. Their objectives, however, were slightly more complex than the original design of the software: the aircraft needs a maximized lift to drag ratio, to be longitudinally neutral (not wanting to pitch up or down while without a tail), to have a maximum angle of attack, to have a minimum cabin volume and shape, and have a maximum thickness on the outboard wings. Using three different components, they expanded their computational model to incorporate as many constraints as possible, including viscous effects. This method involves significantly more computational power. Their initial findings saved a lot of money in building and testing – since it causes supersonic flow of air, a shock wave forms on the aft part of the wing, drastically increasing drag and reducing lift. After modifying their goals to only keep the lift to drag ratio high and even out the pressure, the simulation provided a better design – showing that this tool is very adaptable to the situation at hand. The end result of this study was that Airbus had a set of airfoil designs that are suited to a very large wing-body aircraft. This also proved that these methods are successful at adapting to any task that they would require.

=== Post-manufacturing changes ===
This method of optimization can also be used to develop a post-manufacture modification to an existing wing. In 2006, Antony Jameson modified the code to increase the speed of a race P-51 Mustang. This goal is different still – the Reno Air Race is a straight drag from one point to another at a relatively low altitude. The goal is to improve the top speed to reach a propeller-driven record. Since the change must be glued onto the wing, this severely limits the changes possible. The problem is similar to the previous example – shock wave buildup. To accomplish this, the software was restricted to find a solution that could only distort the wing planform outwards, away from the control surfaces. Using a lift coefficient of 0.1 and a speed of Mach 0.78, the software produced a bump near the front of the top of the wing. The interruptions of air flow at that particular speed travel back the right distance to break up the shock, reducing the drag. While the aircraft’s drag was increased below Mach 0.73, that was thrown out as being less important than a top speed. If these modifications perform as expected, then this validates the use of the software tool to improve on an existing production wing without remanufacture.

== Multi-point optimization ==
Still, all of these methods have a weakness – they are tuned for one particular set of conditions and speed. In 2007, Jameson introduced both an additional step and a new method of calculations. To account for additional conditions, such as take-off, landing, climbing, and cruising, the modeler calculates all of these simultaneously, rather than only one at a time. Each gradient calculation g is assigned a weight β. Higher priority items, such as cruising drag, are given more weight. The gradient to determine an overall ‘loss’ or a ‘gain’ for the design is created by summing all the gradients times each respective weight. What this allows for is if a change drastically improves takeoff performance but results in a slight hit on cruising performance, the cruising hit can override the takeoff gain due to weighting. Setting the simulation up in this manner can significantly improve the designs produced by the software. This version of the modeler, however, adds yet another complexity to the initial conditions, and a slight error on the designer’s behalf can have a significantly larger effect on the resulting design. The calculation efficiency improvement takes advantage of the multiple variables. This time, two different points were used for the Boeing 747-200 – Mach 0.85 and 0.87. Unfortunately, optimizing for the two points resulted in less than a 3% improvement over drag and almost no weight improvement on the base design. To check his work, he used the same simulation on another aircraft wing and received similar results. The problem observed is that changes that boosted one point of interest directly conflicted with the other, and the resulting compromise severely hampers the improvement gained. His current research involves a better way to resolve the differences and achieve an improvement similar to the single-point optimizations.
