= Simulation modeling =

Simulation modeling is the process of creating and analyzing a digital prototype of a physical model to predict its performance in the real world. Simulation modeling is used to help designers and engineers understand whether, under what conditions, and in which ways a part could fail and what loads it can withstand. Simulation modeling can also help to predict fluid flow and heat transfer patterns. It analyses the approximate working conditions by applying the simulation software.

== Uses of simulation modeling ==
Simulation modeling allows designers and engineers to avoid the repeated building of multiple physical prototypes to analyze designs for new or existing parts. Before creating the physical prototype, users can investigate many digital prototypes. Using the technique, they can:

- Optimize geometry for weight and strength
- Select materials that meet weight, strength, and budget requirements
- Simulate part failure and identify the loading conditions that cause them
- Assess extreme environmental conditions or loads not easily tested on physical prototypes, such as earthquake shock load
- Verify hand calculations
- Validate the likely safety and survival of a physical prototype before

== Typical simulation modeling workflow ==
Simulation modeling follows a process much like this:

1. Use a 2D or 3D CAD tool to develop a virtual model, also known as a digital prototype, to represent a design.
2. Generate a 2D or 3D mesh for analysis calculations. Automatic algorithms can create finite element meshes, or users can create structured meshes to maintain control over element quality.
3. Define finite element analysis data (loads, constraints, or materials) based on analysis type (thermal, structural, or fluid). Apply boundary conditions to the model to represent how the part will be restrained during use.
4. Perform finite element analysis, review results, and make engineering judgments based on results.

== See also ==
- Comparison of system dynamics software
- Mathematical and theoretical biology
- Operations research
- Power system simulation
