= Oswald Moser =

British artist and illustrator

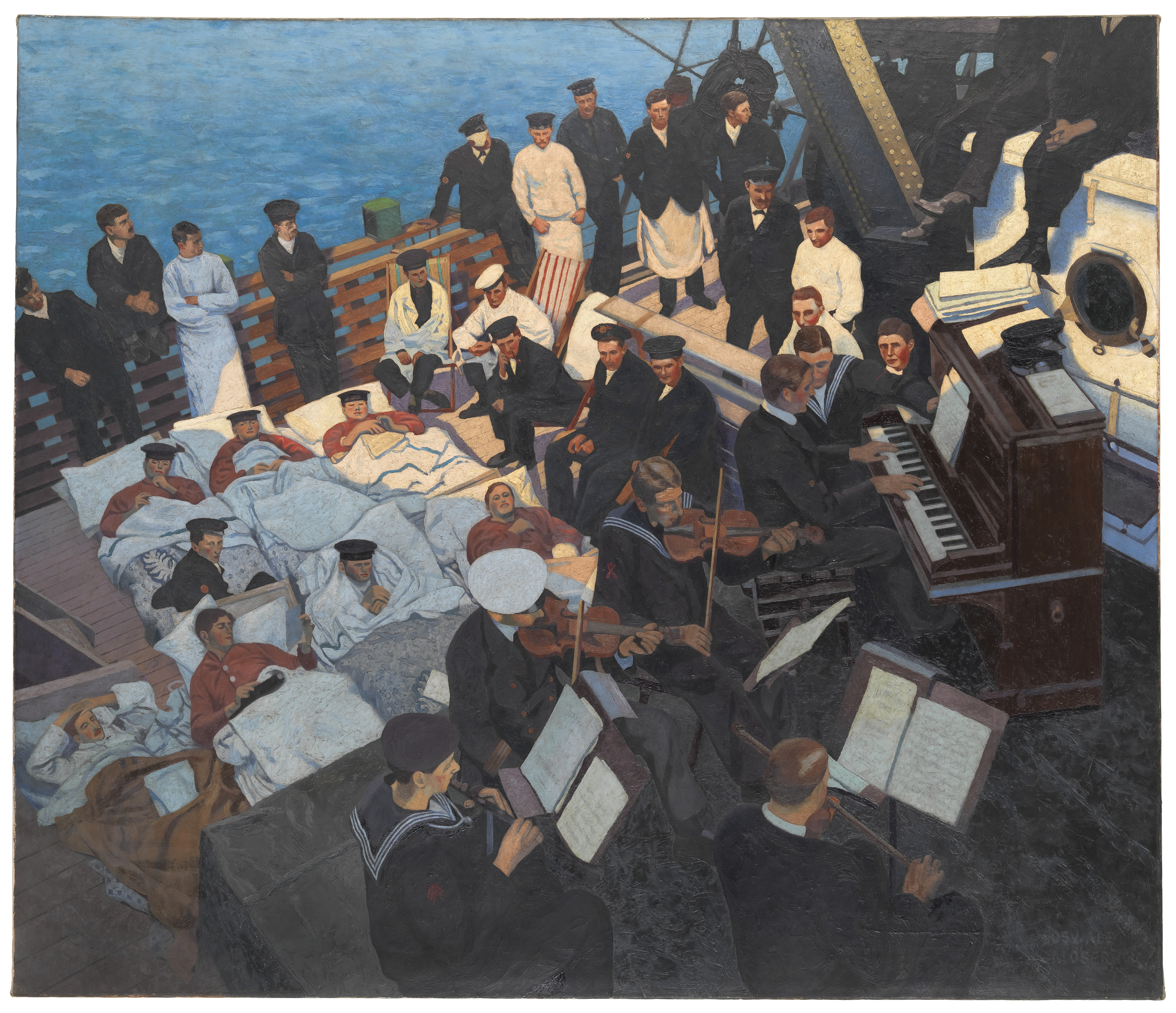
- Wounded sailors listening to musicians (Wellcome Collection, c. 1918)
- Born: Robert Oswald Moser; 1874; London, United Kingdom
- Died: 1953 (aged 78–79)
- Occupation: Artist

Robert Oswald Moser (1874-1953) was a British artist and illustrator.

== Life ==
Born in London in 1874, Moser studied at St John's Wood Art School.

During the First World War Moser joined the Royal Navy, serving as an officer in the Royal Navy Volunteer Reserve. A number of his paintings relate to this time at sea.

He also made a proposal to Charles Ffoulkes of the Imperial War Museum to paint "the whole of the front line" in 1918 but the proposal was not accepted.

== Works ==
Works by Moser are held by the Wellcome Collection, the Imperial War Museum, Rye Art Gallery and Glasgow Museums.
