= Jaime Peraire =

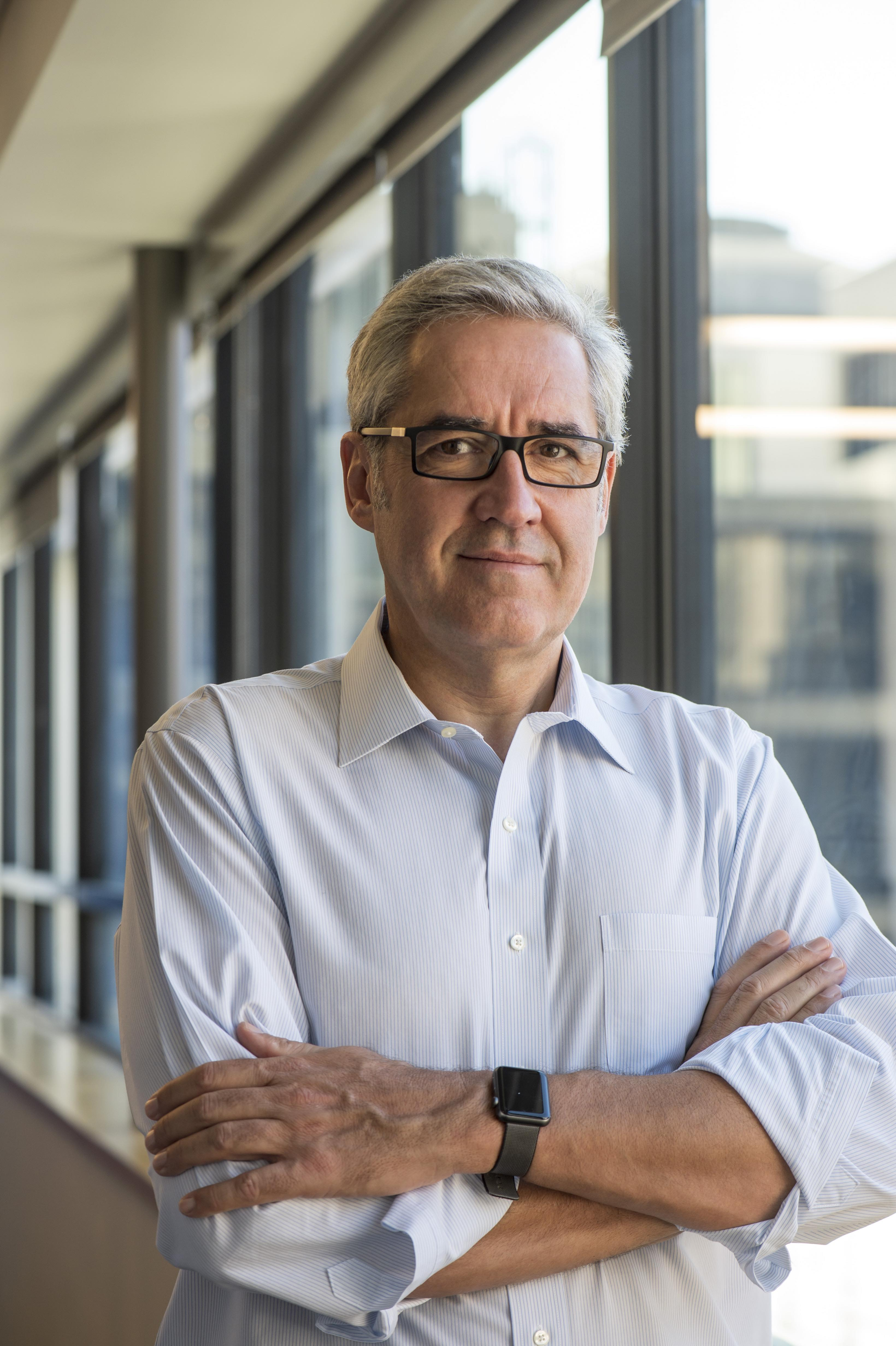
- Born: 1960 (age 64–65); Barcelona
- Occupation: Professor
- Known for: Numerical Analysis, Finite Element Methods, Computational Aerodynamics
- Scientific career
- Fields: Computational Aspects of Aeronautics and Astronautics
- Institutions: Massachusetts Institute of Technology

Jaime Peraire (Catalan language: Jaume Peraire i Guitart), from Barcelona, is the H. N. Slater Professor of Aeronautics and Astronautics and former head of the Department of Aeronautics and Astronautics at the Massachusetts Institute of Technology. He specializes in computational aspects of aeronautics and astronautics.

== Education ==
- Ingeniero de Caminos, Canales y Puertos, 1983, Polytechnic University of Catalonia. (Entry degree in civil engineering) (Note: English: Engineer of Roads, Canals and Ports)
- PhD, University of Wales, 1983.
- Doctor Ingeniero de Caminos, Canales y Puertos, 1987, University of Barcelona. (Doctorate in civil engineering)

== Career ==
Peraire is the H. N. Slater Professor of Aeronautics and Astronautics at the Massachusetts Institute of Technology. He served as head of the department from 2011 until 2018. He is on the faculty of MIT's Aerospace Computational Design Laboratory. Previously he was a faculty member at the University of Wales and at Imperial College, London. He is a Fellow of both the American Institute of Aeronautics and Astronautics and the International Association for Computational Mechanics. His research interests include numerical analysis, finite element methods, and computational aerodynamics. His teaching interests are computational mechanics, numerical methods for partial differential equations, and dynamics.

He is active in the international CDIO Initiative, an educational framework stressing engineering fundamentals.

== Honors and awards ==
Among his honors and awards are:

- Department of Aeronautics and Astronautics, MIT, Raymond L. Bisplinghoff Faculty Fellow, 2003-2006
- Honorary Professor, School of Engineering, University of Wales, Swansea, 2005
- H.N. Slater Professor of Aeronautics and Astronautics, MIT, 2011
- Spanish Society for Numerical Methods in Engineering, SEMNI Prize, 2013
- Catalan Civil Engineers Association, Ildefons Cerdá Medal, 2015
- US Association for Computational Mechanics, T.J. Hughes Medal, 2015
- Polytechnic University of Catalonia, Honorary Doctorate, 2022

== Publications ==
Peraire is the author of more than 250 articles and conference papers in his field.
