= Topology optimization =

Mathematical method for optimizing material layout under given conditions

Topology optimization is a mathematical method that optimizes material layout within a given design space, for a given set of loads, boundary conditions, and constraints with the goal of maximizing the performance of the system. Topology optimization is different from shape optimization and sizing optimization in the sense that the design can attain any shape within the design space, instead of dealing with predefined configurations.

The conventional topology optimization formulation uses a finite element method (FEM) to evaluate the design performance. The design is optimized using either gradient-based mathematical-programming techniques such as the optimality criteria algorithm and the method of moving asymptotes or non-gradient-based algorithms such as genetic algorithms.

Topology optimization has a wide range of applications in aerospace, mechanical, biochemical, and civil engineering. Currently, engineers mostly use topology optimization at the concept level of a design process. Due to the free forms that naturally occur, the result is often difficult to manufacture. For that reason, the result emerging from topology optimization is often fine-tuned for manufacturability. Adding constraints to the formulation in order to increase the manufacturability is an active field of research. In some cases, results from topology optimization can be directly manufactured using additive manufacturing; topology optimization is thus a key part of design for additive manufacturing.

== Problem statement ==
A topology-optimization problem can be written in the general form of an optimization problem as:

$$\begin{align}
&\underset{\rho}{\operatorname{minimize}} & &F = F(\mathbf{u(\rho), \rho}) = \int_{\Omega} f(\mathbf{u(\rho), \rho}) \mathrm{d}V \\
&\operatorname{subject\;to}
& &G_0(\rho) = \int_{\Omega} \rho \mathrm{d}V - V_0 \leq 0 \\
&&&G_j(\mathbf{u}(\rho), \rho) \leq 0 \text{ with } j = 1,..., m.
\end{align}$$

The problem statement includes the following:

- An objective function $F(\mathbf{u(\rho), \rho})$. This function represents the quantity that is being minimized for best performance. The most common objective function is compliance, where minimizing compliance leads to maximizing the stiffness of a structure.
- The material distribution as a problem variable. This is described by the density of the material at each location, $\rho(\mathbf{x})$. Material is either present, indicated by a 1, or absent, indicated by a 0. $\mathbf{u}=\mathbf{u}(\mathbf{\rho})$ is a state field that satisfies a linear or nonlinear state equation depending on $\rho$.
- The design space $(\Omega)$. This indicates the allowable volume within which the design can exist. Assembly and packaging requirements and human and tool accessibility are some of the factors that need to be considered in identifying this space. With the definition of the design space, regions or components in the model that cannot be modified during the course of the optimization are considered as non-design regions.
- $m$ constraints $G_j(\mathbf{u}(\rho), \rho) \leq 0$ a characteristic that the solution must satisfy. Examples are the maximum amount of material to be distributed (volume constraint) or maximum stress values.

Evaluating $\mathbf{u(\rho)}$ often includes solving a differential equation. This is most commonly done using the finite-element method, since these equations do not have any known analytical solution.

== Implementation methodologies ==
There are various implementation methodologies that have been used to solve topology-optimization problems.

=== Solving with discrete/binary variables ===
Solving topology-optimization problems in a discrete sense is done by discretizing the design domain into finite elements. The material densities inside these elements are then treated as the problem variables. In this case, a material density of 1 indicates the presence of material, while 0 indicates an absence of material. Owing to the attainable topological complexity of the design being dependent on the number of elements, a large number is preferred. Large numbers of finite elements increases the attainable topological complexity, but come at a cost. Firstly, solving the FEM system becomes more expensive. Secondly, algorithms that can handle a large number (several thousands of elements is not uncommon) of discrete variables with multiple constraints are unavailable. Moreover, they are impractically sensitive to parameter variations. In literature, problems with up to 30,000 variables have been reported.

=== Solving the problem with continuous variables ===
The aforementioned complexities with solving topology optimization problems using binary variables has caused the community to search for other options. One is the modelling of the densities with continuous variables. The material densities can now also attain values between 0 and 1. Gradient-based algorithms that handle large amounts of continuous variables and multiple constraints are available. But the material properties have to be modelled in a continuous setting. This is done through interpolation. One of the most implemented interpolation methodologies is the Solid Isotropic Material with Penalisation method (SIMP). This interpolation is essentially a power law: $E \;=\; E_0 \,+\, \rho^p (E_1 - E_0)$. It interpolates the Young's modulus of the material to the scalar selection field. The value of the penalisation parameter $p$ is generally taken between $[1,\, 3]$. This has been shown to confirm the micro-structure of the materials. In the SIMP method, a lower bound on the Young's modulus is added, $E_0$, to make sure that the derivatives of the objective function are non-zero when the density becomes zero. The higher the penalisation factor, the more SIMP penalises the algorithm in the use of non-binary densities. Unfortunately, the penalisation parameter also introduces non-convexities.

=== Commercial software ===
There are several commercial topology-optimization softwares on the market, such as COMSOL Multiphysics. Most of them use topology optimization as a hint to how the optimal design should look, and manual geometry re-construction is required. There are a few solutions which produce optimal designs ready for additive manufacturing.

== Examples ==
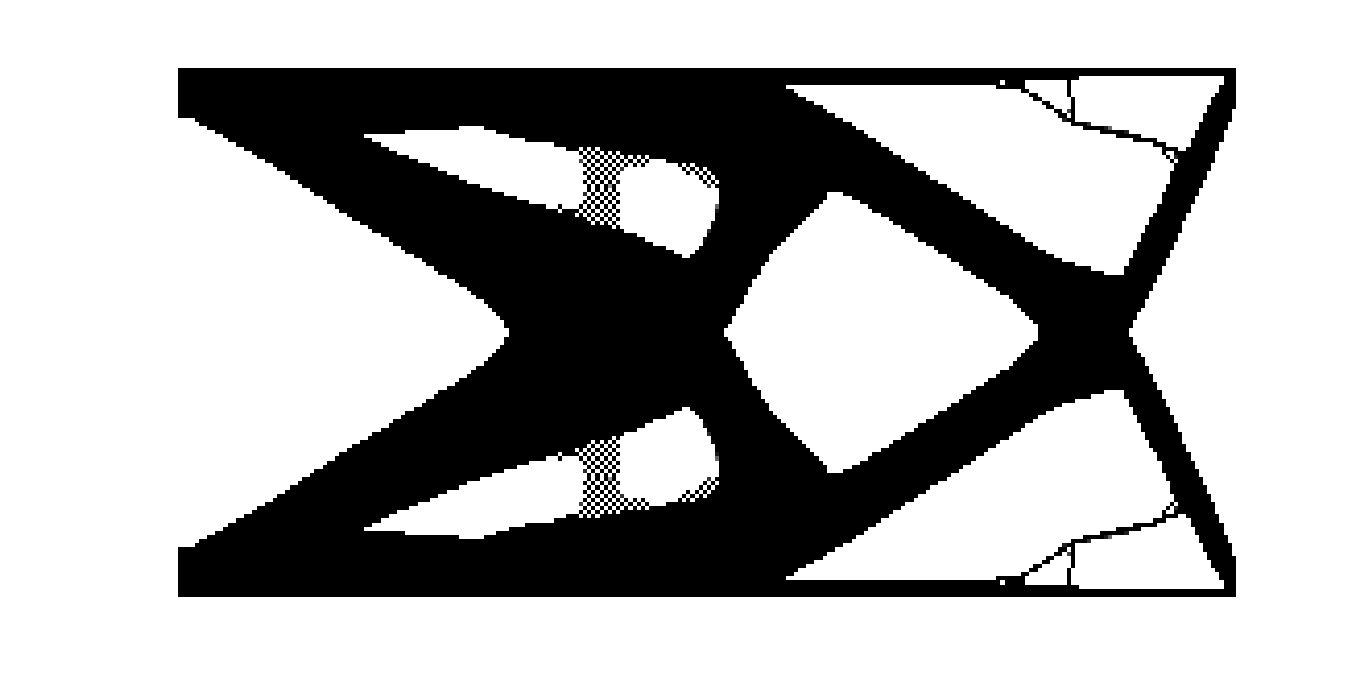
Checker Board Patterns are shown in this result

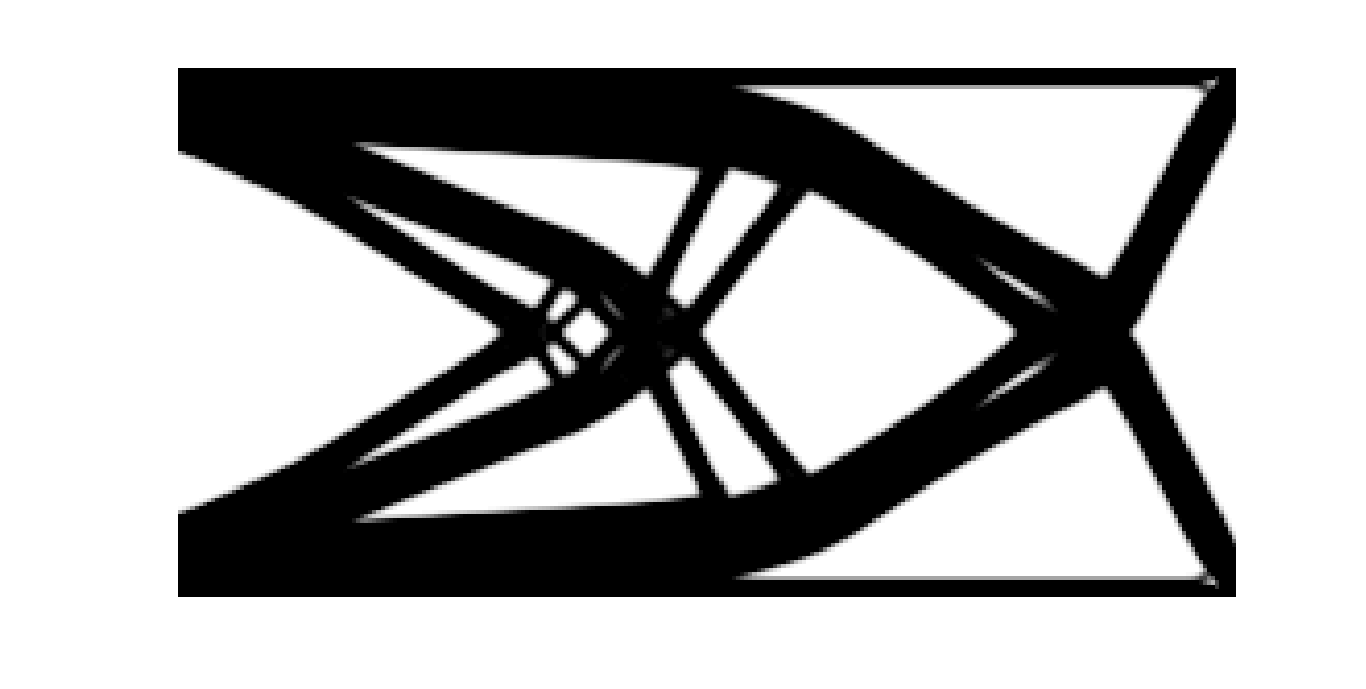
Topology optimization result when filtering is used

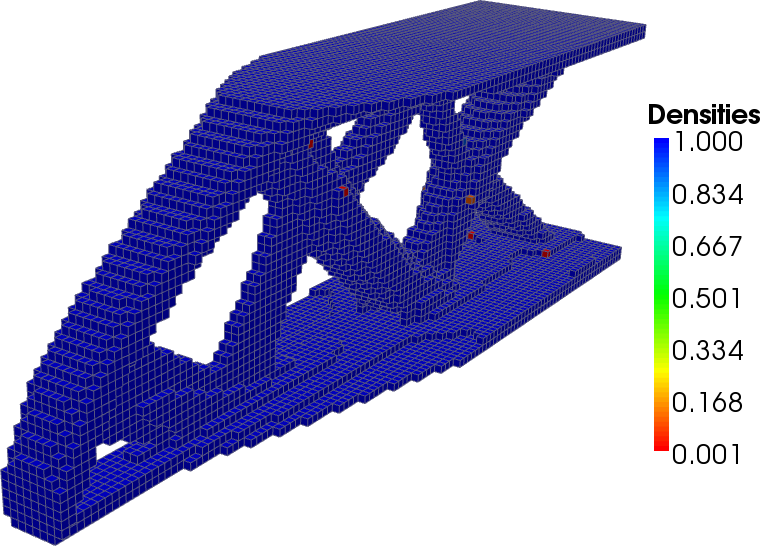
Topology optimization of a compliance problem

=== Structural compliance ===
A stiff structure is one that has the least possible displacement when given certain set of boundary conditions. A global measure of the displacements is the strain energy (also called compliance) of the structure under the prescribed boundary conditions. The lower the strain energy, the higher the stiffness of the structure. So, the objective function of the problem is to minimize the strain energy.

On a broad level, one can visualize that the more the material, the less the deflection, as there will be more material to resist the loads. So, the optimization requires an opposing constraint, the volume constraint. This is in reality a cost factor, as one would not want to spend a lot of money on the material. To obtain the total material used, an integration of the selection field over the volume can be done.

Finally, the elasticity-governing differential equations are plugged in so as to get the final problem statement:

$$\min_{\rho}\; \int_{\Omega} \frac{1}{2} \mathbf{\sigma}:\mathbf{\varepsilon} \,\mathrm{d}\Omega$$

subject to:

- $\rho \,\in\, [0,\, 1]$
- $\int_{\Omega} \rho\, \mathrm{d}\Omega \;\leq\; V^*$
- $\mathbf{\nabla}\cdot\mathbf{\sigma} \,+\, \mathbf{F} \;=\; {\mathbf{0}}$
- $\mathbf{\sigma} \;=\; \mathsf{C}:\mathbf{\varepsilon}$

But, a straightforward implementation in the finite-element framework of such a problem is still infeasible due to issues such as:

1. Mesh dependency—The design obtained on one mesh can be very different from that obtained on another mesh. The features of the design become more intricate as the mesh gets refined.
2. Numerical instabilities—A small change to an input parameter can produce a large change in the computed solution.

Some techniques such as filtering based on image processing are currently being used to alleviate some of these issues. Although it seemed like this was purely a heuristic approach for a long time, theoretical connections to nonlocal elasticity have been made to support the physical sense of these methods.

=== Multiphysics problems ===
==== Fluid-structure interaction ====
Fluid-structure interaction is a strongly coupled phenomenon and concerns the interaction between a stationary or moving fluid and an elastic structure. Many engineering applications and natural phenomena are subject to fluid-structure interactions, and taking such effects into consideration is therefore critical in the design of many engineering applications. Topology optimization for fluid-structure interaction problems has been studied in e.g. references, and. Design solutions solved for different Reynolds numbers are shown below. The design solutions depend on the fluid flow, which indicates that the coupling between the fluid and the structure is resolved in the design problems.

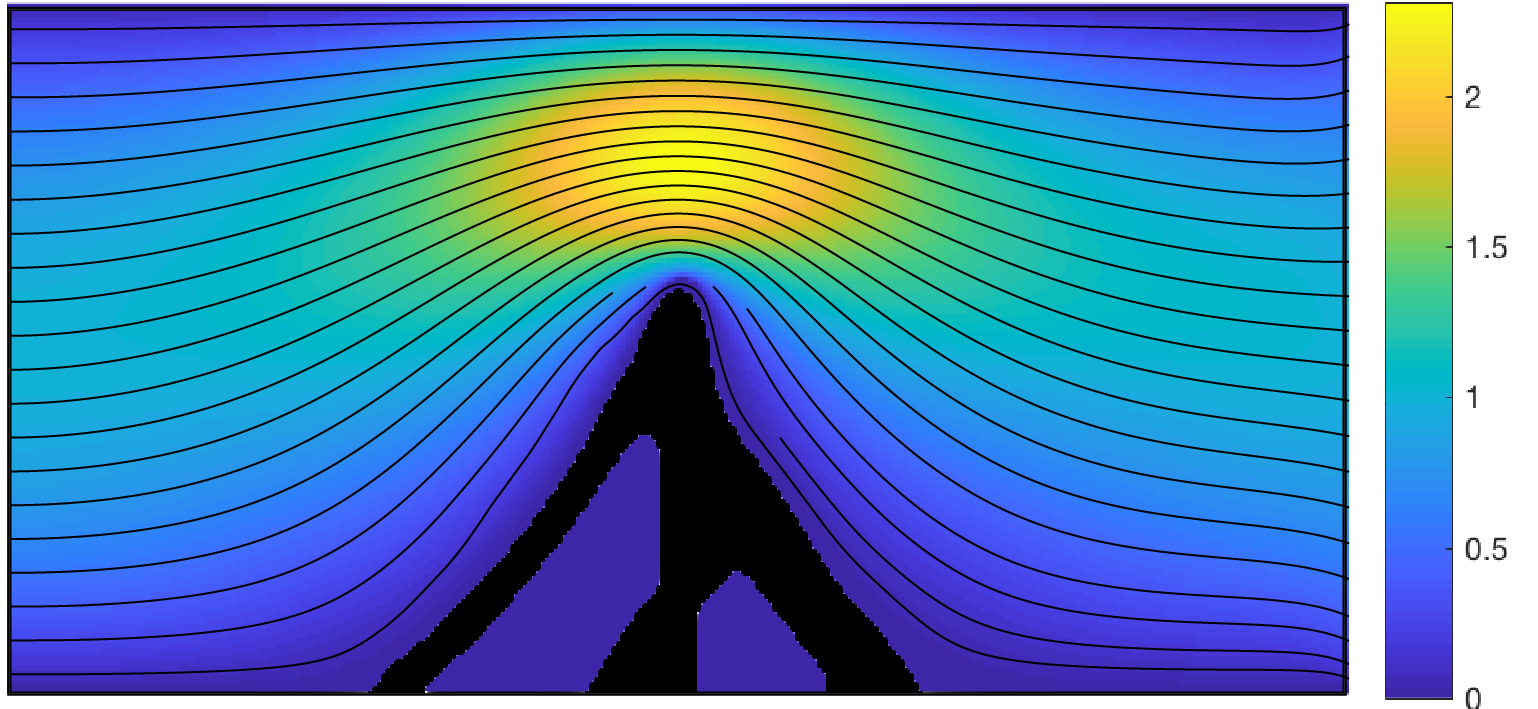
Design solution and velocity field for Re=1

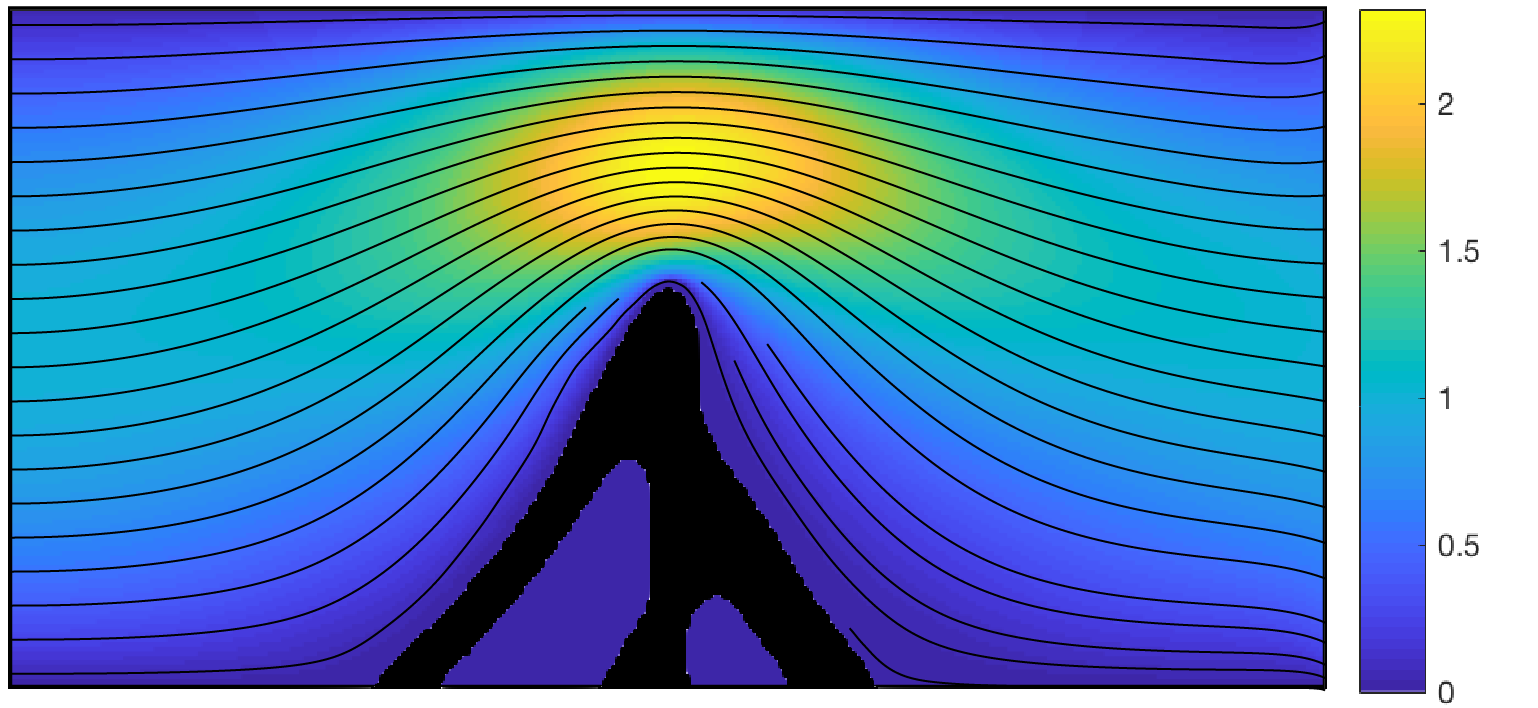
Design solution and velocity field for Re=5

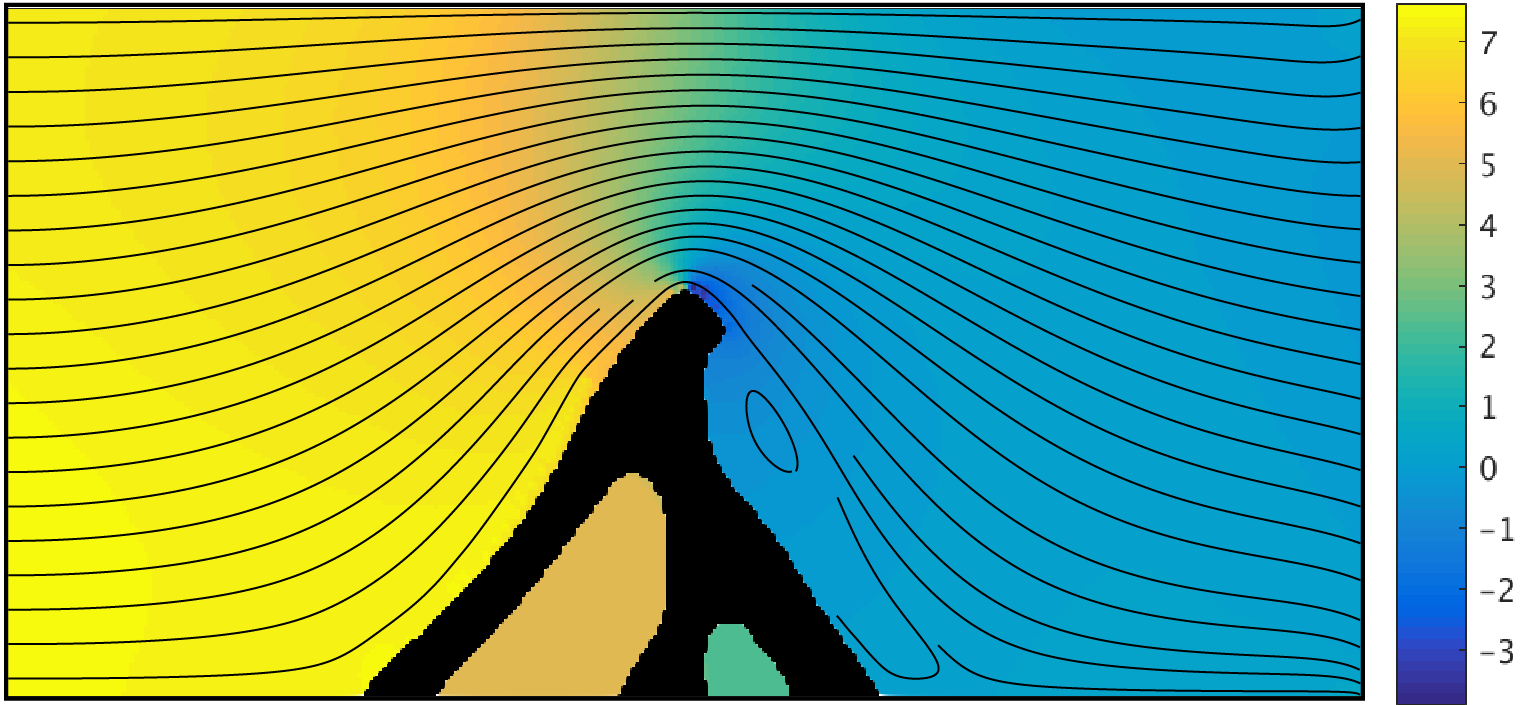
Design solution and pressure field for Re=10

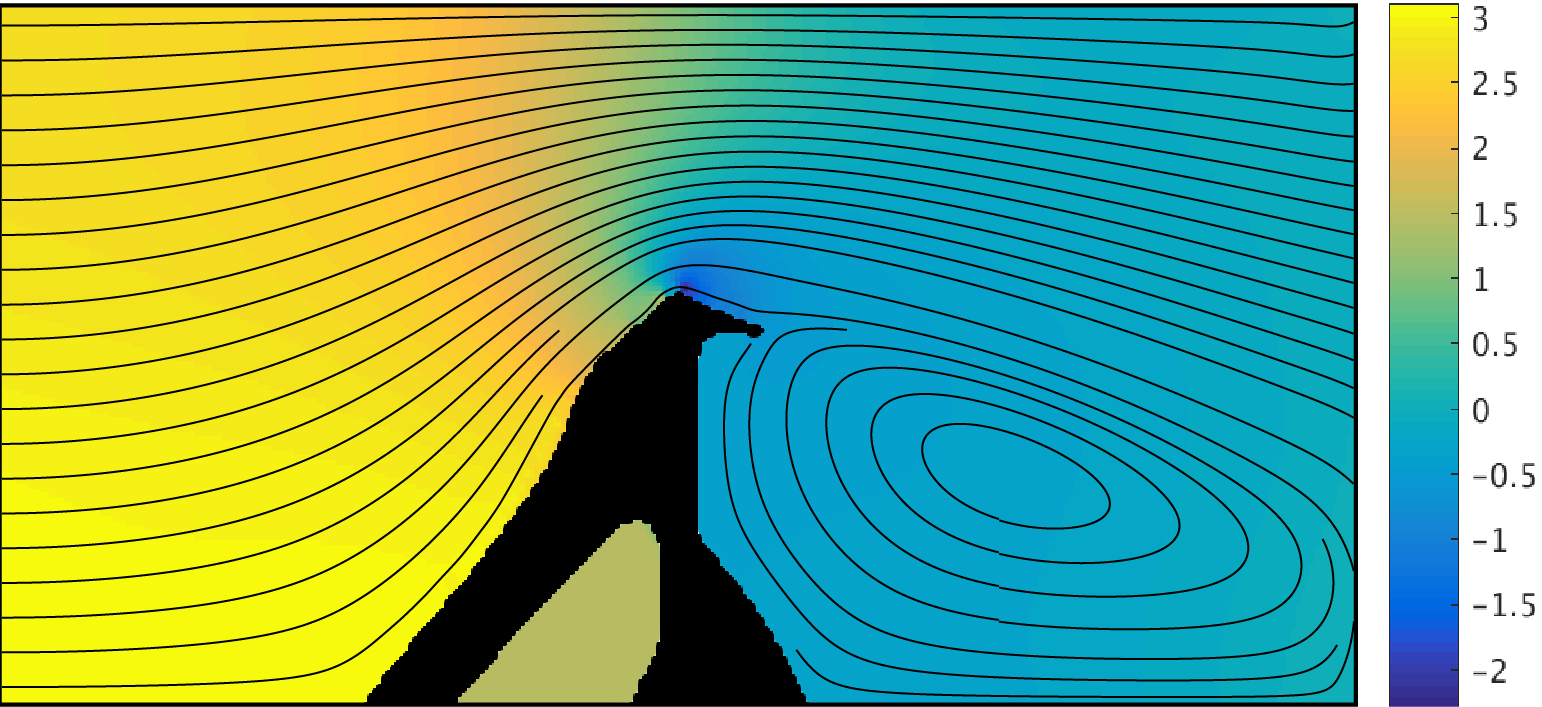
Design solution and pressure field for Re=40

Design solutions for different Reynolds number for a wall inserted in a channel with a moving fluid.

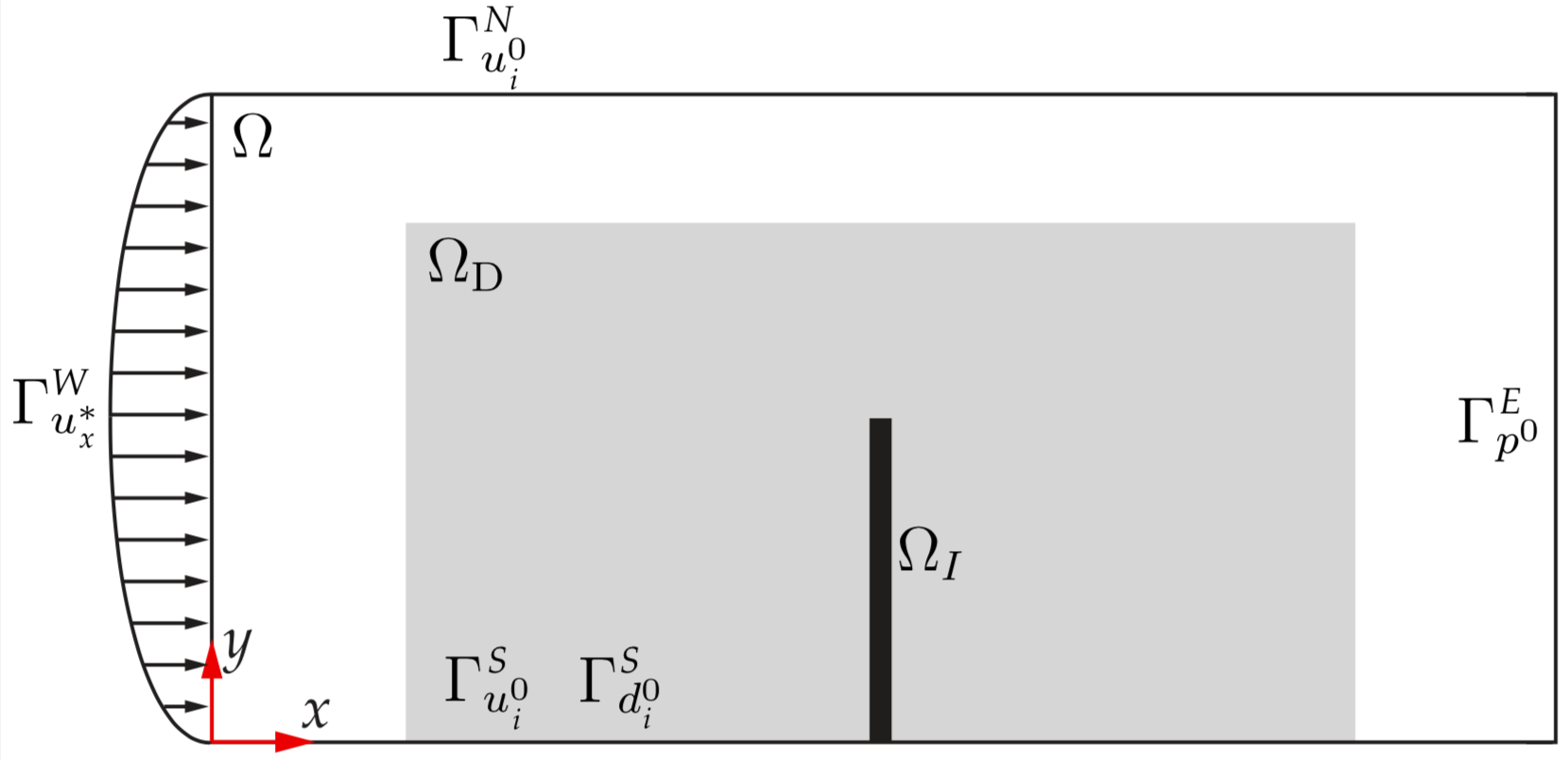
Sketch of the well-known wall problem. The objective of the design problem is to minimize the structural compliance.

Design evolution for a fluid-structure-interaction problem from reference. The objective of the design problem is to minimize the structural compliance. The fluid-structure-interaction problem is modelled with Navier-Cauchy and Navier-Stokes equations.

==== Thermoelectric energy conversion ====
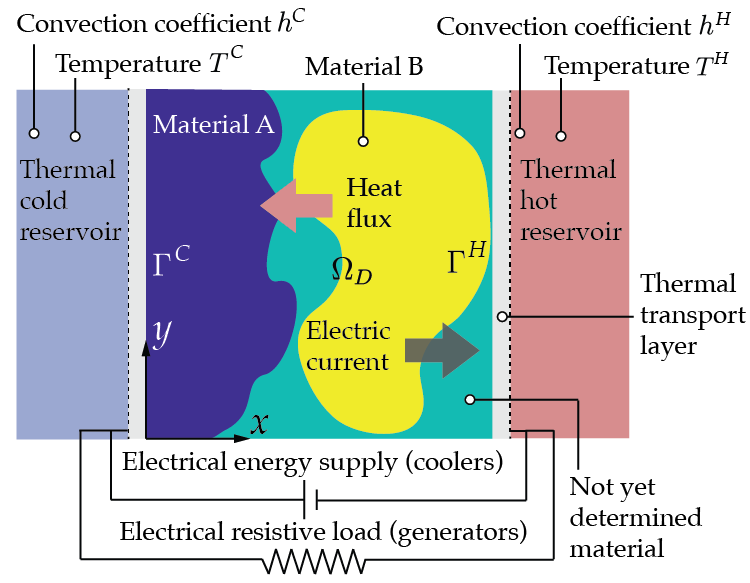
A sketch of the design problem. The aim of the design problem is to spatially distribute two materials, Material A and Material B, to maximise a performance measure such as cooling power or electric power output

Design evolution for an off-diagonal thermoelectric generator. The design solution of an optimisation problem solved for electric power output. The performance of the device has been optimised by distributing Skutterudite (yellow) and bismuth telluride (blue) with a density-based topology optimisation methodology. The aim of the optimisation problem is to maximise the electric power output of the thermoelectric generator.

Design evolution for a thermoelectric cooler. The aim of the design problem is to maximise the cooling power of the thermoelectric cooler.

Thermoelectricity is a multi-physics phenomenon which concerns the interaction and coupling between electric and thermal energy in semiconducting materials. Thermoelectric energy conversion can be described by two separately identified effects: the Seebeck effect and the Peltier effect. The Seebeck effect concerns the conversion of thermal energy into electric energy, and the Peltier effect concerns the conversion of electric energy into thermal energy. By spatially distributing two thermoelectric materials in a two-dimensional design space with a topology-optimization methodology, it is possible to exceed the performance of the constitutive thermoelectric materials for thermoelectric coolers and thermoelectric generators.

=== 3F3D: Form Follows Force 3D Printing ===
The current proliferation of 3D printer technology has allowed designers and engineers to use topology-optimization techniques when designing new products. Topology optimization combined with 3D printing can result in less weight, improved structural performance, and shortened design-to-manufacturing cycle, since the designs, while efficient, might not be realisable with more traditional manufacturing techniques.

=== Internal contact ===
3D Topology Optimization with Internal Contact for a hook mechanism.

Design development and deformation of self-engaging hooks resulting from topology optimization of a contact problem using the TMC method.

Internal contact can be included in topology optimization by applying the third medium contact method. The third medium contact (TMC) method is an implicit contact formulation that is continuous and differentiable. This makes TMC suitable for use with gradient-based approaches to topology optimization. Monolithic as well as staggered approaches, which are more common in topology optimization, have been used to create various designs with internal contact. Recently, thermal contact has been included in the TMC topology optimization framework.

== See also ==
- Generative design
