= George Biros =

American engineer

George Biros is a Greek-American engineer, currently the W. A. "Tex" Moncrief Professor in Simulation-Based Engineering Endowed Chair #2 at the University of Texas at Austin.
