= Charles William Clenshaw =

English mathematician

Charles William Clenshaw (15 March 1926, Southend-on-Sea, Essex – 23 September 2004) was an English mathematician, specializing in numerical analysis. He is known for the Clenshaw algorithm (1955) and Clenshaw–Curtis quadrature (1960). In a 1984 paper Beyond Floating Point, Clenshaw and Frank W. J. Olver introduced symmetric level-index arithmetic.

== Biography ==
Charles William Clenshaw attended the local high school in Southend-on-Sea from 1937 to 1943. In 1946 he graduated with a degree in mathematics and physics from King's College London. There in 1948 he graduated with a PhD in mathematics. From 1945 to 1969 he was a mathematician at the UK's National Physical Laboratory (NPL) in Bushy Park, Teddington. There from 1961 to 1969 he was a senior principal scientific officer and headed the numerical methods group in NPL's mathematics division. In 1969 he resigned from NPL and accepted an appointment as professor of numerical analysis at Lancaster University. He and Emlyn Howard Lloyd (1918–2008), professor of statistics, strengthened the mathematics department, and the department's numerical analysis group became one of best in the UK. The mathematics department hosted the first four summer schools in numerical analysis sponsored by the UK's Engineering and Physical Sciences Research Council.

Charles was head of Lancaster's mathematics department from 1975 to 1978 and from 1982 to 1984, but in the 1980s, the government instituted broad cuts in the number of faculty members in many universities. As department head, Charles was instructed to select one member for dismissal. Regarding this instruction as totally unfair, he dismissed himself — taking early retirement in 1985. He was then honoured as professor emeritus.

Clenshaw did research in approximation theory based on Chebyshev polynomials, software development supporting trigonometric functions, Bessel functions, etc., and computer arithmetic systems. His PhD students include William Allan Light (1950–2002).

Upon his death, Clenshaw was survived by his wife, three sons, a daughter, and ten grandchildren. Sgt. Ian Charles Cooper Clenshaw (1918–1940), one of Charles William Clenshaw's brothers, was officially the first RAF pilot to be killed in the Battle of Britain.

== Selected publications ==
- Clenshaw, C. W. (July 1955). "A note on the summation of Chebyshev series". Mathematical Tables and Other Aids to Computation. 9 (51): 118–120. doi:10.1090/S0025-5718-1955-0071856-0. ISSN 0025-5718. (over 380 citations)
- Clenshaw, C. W. (1957). "The numerical solution of linear differential equations in Chebyshev series". Mathematical Proceedings of the Cambridge Philosophical Society. 53 (1): 134–149. Bibcode:1957PCPS...53..134C. doi:10.1017/S0305004100032072. (over 240 citations)
- Clenshaw, C. W.; Curtis, A. R. (1960). "A method for numerical integration on an automatic computer". Numerische Mathematik. 2: 197–205. doi:10.1007/BF01386223. S2CID 120713218. (over 1110 citations)
- Clenshaw, C. W. (1960). "Curve Fitting with a Digital Computer". The Computer Journal. 2 (4): 170–173. doi:10.1093/comjnl/2.4.170.
- Clenshaw, C. W.; Elliott, D. (1960). "A Numerical Treatment of the Orrsommerfeld Equation in the Case of a Laminar Jet". The Quarterly Journal of Mechanics and Applied Mathematics. 13 (3): 300–313. doi:10.1093/qjmam/13.3.300.
- Clenshaw, C. W.; Miller, G. F.; Woodger, M. (1962). "Algorithms for Special Functions I". Numerische Mathematik. 4: 403–419. doi:10.1007/BF01386339. S2CID 120542461.
- Clenshaw, C. W. (1963). "The solution of nonlinear ordinary differential equations in Chebyshev series". The Computer Journal. 6: 88–92. doi:10.1093/comjnl/6.1.88.
- Clenshaw, C. W. (1964). "A Comparison of "Best" Polynomial Approximations with Truncated Chebyshev Series Expansions". Journal of the Society for Industrial and Applied Mathematics, Series B: Numerical Analysis. 1 (1): 26–37. Bibcode:1964SJNA....1...26C. doi:10.1137/0701003.
- Clenshaw, C. W.; Hayes, J. G. (1965). "Curve and Surface Fitting". IMA Journal of Applied Mathematics. 1 (2): 164–183. doi:10.1093/imamat/1.2.164.
- Clenshaw, C. W.; Negus, B. (1978). "The Cubic X-Spline and its Application to Interpolation". IMA Journal of Applied Mathematics. 22: 109–119. doi:10.1093/imamat/22.1.109.
- Clenshaw, C. W.; Olver, F. W. J. (1980). "An Unrestricted Algorithm for the Exponential Function". SIAM Journal on Numerical Analysis. 17 (2): 310–331. Bibcode:1980SJNA...17..310C. doi:10.1137/0717026.
- Clenshaw, C. W.; Olver, F. W. J. (1984). "Beyond Floating Point". Journal of the ACM. 31 (2): 319–328. doi:10.1145/62.322429. S2CID 5132225. (over 100 citations)
- Clenshaw, C.W.; Lozier, D.W.; Olver, F.W.J.; Turner, P.R. (1986). "Generalized exponential and logarithmic functions". Computers & Mathematics with Applications. 12 (5–6): 1091–1101. doi:10.1016/0898-1221(86)90233-6.
- Clenshaw, C. W.; Olver, F. W. J. (1987). "Level-Index Arithmetic Operations". SIAM Journal on Numerical Analysis. 24 (2): 470–485. Bibcode:1987SJNA...24..470C. doi:10.1137/0724034.
- Clenshaw, C. W.; Turner, P. R. (1988). "The Symmetric Level-Index System". IMA Journal of Numerical Analysis. 8 (4): 517–526. doi:10.1093/imanum/8.4.517.
- Clenshaw, C. W.; Olver, F. W. J.; Turner, P. R. (1989). "Level-index arithmetic: An introductory survey". Numerical Analysis and Parallel Processing. Lecture Notes in Mathematics. Vol. 1397. pp. 95–168. doi:10.1007/BFb0085718. ISBN 978-3-540-51645-3.
