= Clenshaw algorithm =

Method in numerical analysis

In numerical analysis, the Clenshaw algorithm, also called Clenshaw summation, is a recursive method to evaluate a linear combination of Chebyshev polynomials. The method was published by Charles William Clenshaw in 1955. It is a generalization of Horner's method for evaluating a linear combination of monomials.

It generalizes to more than just Chebyshev polynomials; it applies to any class of functions that can be defined by a three-term recurrence relation.

== Clenshaw algorithm ==
In full generality, the Clenshaw algorithm computes the weighted sum of a finite series of functions $\phi_k(x)$:
$$S(x) = \sum_{k=0}^n a_k \phi_k(x)$$
where $\phi_k,\; k=0, 1, \ldots$ is a sequence of functions that satisfy the linear recurrence relation
$$\phi_{k+1}(x) = \alpha_k(x)\,\phi_k(x) + \beta_k(x)\,\phi_{k-1}(x),$$
where the coefficients $\alpha_k(x)$ and $\beta_k(x)$ are known in advance.

The algorithm is most useful when $\phi_k(x)$ are functions that are complicated to compute directly, but $\alpha_k(x)$ and $\beta_k(x)$ are particularly simple. In the most common applications, $\alpha(x)$ does not depend on $k$, and $\beta$ is a constant that depends on neither $x$ nor $k$.

To perform the summation for given series of coefficients $a_0, \ldots, a_n$, compute the values $b_k(x)$ by the "reverse" recurrence formula:
$$\begin{align}
b_{n+1}(x) &= b_{n+2}(x) = 0, \\
b_k(x) &= a_k + \alpha_k(x)\,b_{k+1}(x) + \beta_{k+1}(x)\,b_{k+2}(x).
\end{align}$$

Note that this computation makes no direct reference to the functions $\phi_k(x)$. After computing $b_2(x)$ and $b_1(x)$, the desired sum can be expressed in terms of them and the simplest functions $\phi_0(x)$ and $\phi_1(x)$:
$$S(x) = \phi_0(x)\,a_0 + \phi_1(x)\,b_1(x) + \beta_1(x)\,\phi_0(x)\,b_2(x).$$

See Fox and Parker for more information and stability analyses.

== Examples ==
=== Horner as a special case of Clenshaw ===
A particularly simple case occurs when evaluating a polynomial of the form
$$S(x) = \sum_{k=0}^n a_k x^k.$$
The functions are simply
$$\begin{align}
\phi_0(x) &= 1, \\
\phi_k(x) &= x^k = x\phi_{k-1}(x)
\end{align}$$
and are produced by the recurrence coefficients $\alpha(x) = x$ and $\beta = 0$.

In this case, the recurrence formula to compute the sum is
$$b_k(x) = a_k + x b_{k+1}(x)$$
and, in this case, the sum is simply
$$S(x) = a_0 + x b_1(x) = b_0(x),$$
which is exactly the usual Horner's method.

=== Special case for Chebyshev series ===
Consider a truncated Chebyshev series
$$p_n(x) = a_0 + a_1 T_1(x) + a_2 T_2(x) + \cdots + a_n T_n(x).$$

The coefficients in the recursion relation for the Chebyshev polynomials are
$$\alpha(x) = 2x, \quad \beta = -1,$$
with the initial conditions
$$T_0(x) = 1, \quad T_1(x) = x.$$

Thus, the recurrence is
$$b_k(x) = a_k + 2xb_{k+1}(x) - b_{k+2}(x)$$
and the final results are
$$b_0(x) = a_0 + 2xb_1(x) - b_2(x),$$
$$p_n(x) = \tfrac{1}{2} \left[a_0+b_0(x) - b_2(x)\right].$$

An equivalent expression for the sum is given by
$$p_n(x) = a_0 + xb_1(x) - b_2(x).$$

=== Meridian arc length on the ellipsoid ===
Clenshaw summation is extensively used in geodetic applications. A simple application is summing the trigonometric series to compute the meridian arc distance on the surface of an ellipsoid. These have the form
$$m(\theta) = C_0\,\theta + C_1\sin \theta + C_2\sin 2\theta + \cdots + C_n\sin n\theta.$$

Leaving off the initial $C_0\,\theta$ term, the remainder is a summation of the appropriate form. There is no leading term because $\phi_0(\theta) = \sin 0\theta = \sin 0 = 0$.

The recurrence relation for $\sin k\theta$ is
$$\sin (k+1)\theta = 2 \cos\theta \sin k\theta - \sin (k-1)\theta,$$
making the coefficients in the recursion relation
$$\alpha_k(\theta) = 2\cos\theta, \quad \beta_k = -1.$$
and the evaluation of the series is given by
$$\begin{align}
b_{n+1}(\theta) &= b_{n+2}(\theta) = 0, \\
b_k(\theta) &= C_k + 2\cos \theta \,b_{k+1}(\theta) - b_{k+2}(\theta),\quad\mathrm{for\ } n\ge k \ge 1.
\end{align}$$
The final step is made particularly simple because $\phi_0(\theta) = \sin 0 = 0$, so the end of the recurrence is simply $b_1(\theta)\sin(\theta)$; the $C_0\,\theta$ term is added separately:
$$m(\theta) = C_0\,\theta + b_1(\theta)\sin \theta.$$

Note that the algorithm requires only the evaluation of two trigonometric quantities $\cos \theta$ and $\sin \theta$.

=== Difference in meridian arc lengths ===
Sometimes it necessary to compute the difference of two meridian arcs in a way that maintains high relative accuracy. This is accomplished by using trigonometric identities to write
$$m(\theta_1)-m(\theta_2) = C_0(\theta_1-\theta_2) + \sum_{k=1}^n 2 C_k
\sin\bigl({\textstyle\frac12}k(\theta_1-\theta_2)\bigr)
\cos\bigl({\textstyle\frac12}k(\theta_1+\theta_2)\bigr).$$
Clenshaw summation can be applied in this case provided we simultaneously compute $m(\theta_1)+m(\theta_2)$ and perform a matrix summation,
$$\mathsf M(\theta_1,\theta_2) = \begin{bmatrix}
(m(\theta_1) + m(\theta_2)) / 2\\
(m(\theta_1) - m(\theta_2)) / (\theta_1 - \theta_2)
\end{bmatrix} =
C_0 \begin{bmatrix} \mu \\ 1 \end{bmatrix} +
\sum_{k=1}^n C_k \mathsf F_k(\theta_1,\theta_2),$$
where
$$\begin{align}
\delta &= \tfrac{1}{2}(\theta_1-\theta_2), \\[1ex]
\mu &= \tfrac{1}{2}(\theta_1+\theta_2), \\[1ex]
\mathsf F_k(\theta_1,\theta_2) &=
\begin{bmatrix}
\cos k \delta \sin k \mu \\
\dfrac{\sin k \delta}\delta \cos k \mu
\end{bmatrix}.
\end{align}$$
The first element of $\mathsf M(\theta_1,\theta_2)$ is the average value of $m$ and the second element is the average slope. $\mathsf F_k(\theta_1,\theta_2)$ satisfies the recurrence relation
$$\mathsf F_{k+1}(\theta_1,\theta_2) =
\mathsf A(\theta_1,\theta_2) \mathsf F_k(\theta_1,\theta_2) -
\mathsf F_{k-1}(\theta_1,\theta_2),$$
where
$$\mathsf A(\theta_1,\theta_2) = 2\begin{bmatrix}
\cos \delta \cos \mu & -\delta\sin \delta \sin \mu \\
- \displaystyle\frac{\sin \delta}\delta \sin \mu &   \cos \delta \cos \mu
\end{bmatrix}$$
takes the place of $\alpha$ in the recurrence relation, and $\beta=-1$. The standard Clenshaw algorithm can now be applied to yield
$$\begin{align}
\mathsf B_{n+1} &= \mathsf B_{n+2} = \mathsf 0, \\[1ex]
\mathsf B_k &= C_k \mathsf I + \mathsf A \mathsf B_{k+1} -
\mathsf B_{k+2}, \qquad\mathrm{for\ } n\ge k \ge 1, \\[1ex]
\mathsf M(\theta_1,\theta_2) &=
C_0 \begin{bmatrix}\mu\\1\end{bmatrix} +
\mathsf B_1 \mathsf F_1(\theta_1,\theta_2),
\end{align}$$
where $\mathsf B_k$ are 2×2 matrices. Finally we have
$$\frac{m(\theta_1) - m(\theta_2)}{\theta_1 - \theta_2} =
\mathsf M_2(\theta_1, \theta_2).$$
This technique can be used in the limit $\theta_2 = \theta_1 = \mu$ and $\delta = 0$ to simultaneously compute $m(\mu)$ and the derivative $dm(\mu)/d\mu$, provided that, in evaluating $\mathsf F_1$ and $\mathsf A$, we take $\lim_{\delta \to 0} (\sin k \delta)/\delta = k$.

== See also ==
- Horner scheme to evaluate polynomials in monomial form
- De Casteljau's algorithm to evaluate polynomials in Bézier form
