= Frank W. J. Olver =

American mathematician (1924–2013)

Frank William John Olver
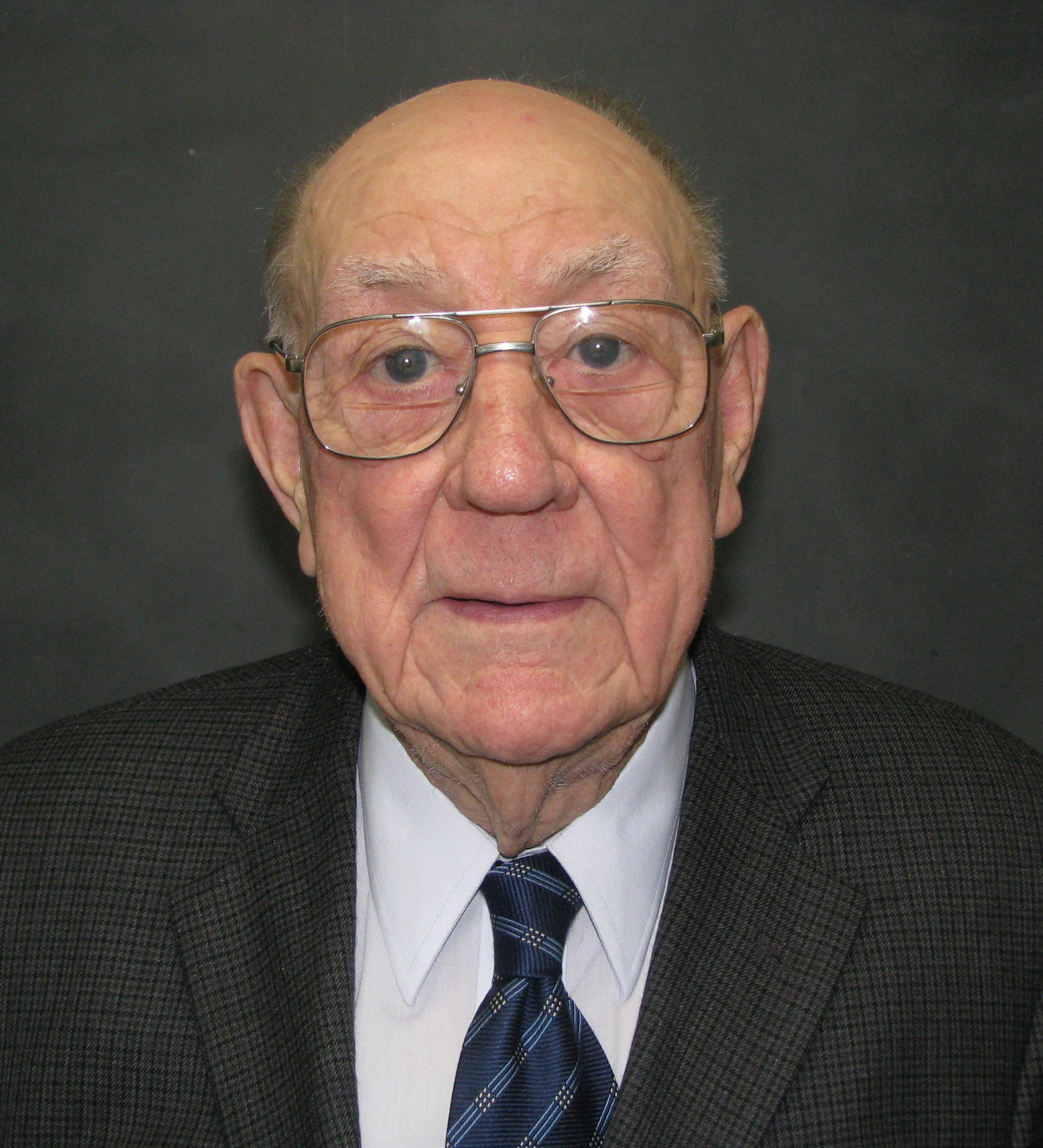
- Olver in 2011
- Born: December 15, 1924; Croydon, UK
- Died: April 23, 2013 (aged 88); Rockville, Maryland, US
- Education: University of London
- Known for: Editor in chief of the NIST Digital Library of Mathematical Functions
- Children: Peter J. Olver
- Awards: Gold Medal of the US Department of Commerce
- Scientific career
- Fields: Mathematics
- Workplaces: University of Maryland, National Institute of Standards and Technology

Frank William John Olver (December 15, 1924 – April 23, 2013) was a professor of mathematics at the Institute for Physical Science and Technology and Department of Mathematics at the University of Maryland who worked on asymptotic analysis, special functions, and numerical analysis. He was the editor in chief of the NIST Digital Library of Mathematical Functions.

== Awards ==
1969: Silver Medal of the US Department of Commerce

1974: Fellow of the U.K. Institute of Mathematics and its Applications

1996: Foreign Member of the Royal Society of Sciences, Uppsala, Sweden

2011: Gold Medal of the US Department of Commerce

== Publications ==
- Olver, Frank W. J. (1997) [1974], Asymptotics and special functions, AKP Classics, Wellesley, MA: A K Peters Ltd., ISBN 978-1-56881-069-0, MR 1429619
- Olver, Frank W. J. (2000), Selected papers of F. W. J. Olver. Part I, II, World Scientific Series in 20th Century Mathematics, vol. 7, River Edge, NJ: World Scientific Publishing Co. Inc., ISBN 978-981-02-4106-3, MR 1759688
- Olver, Frank W. J.; Lozier, Daniel W.; Boisvert, Ronald F.; et al., eds. (2010), NIST Handbook of Mathematical Functions, Cambridge University Press, ISBN 978-0-521-19225-5, MR 2723248

== See also ==
- Level-index arithmetic (LI)
