= Control variates =

Technique for increasing the precision of estimates in Monte Carlo experiments

The control variates method is a variance reduction technique used in Monte Carlo methods. It exploits information about the errors in estimates of known quantities to reduce the error of an estimate of an unknown quantity.

== Underlying principle ==
Let the unknown parameter of interest be $\mu$, and assume we have a statistic $m$ such that the expected value of m is μ: $\mathbb{E}\left[m\right]=\mu$, i.e. m is an unbiased estimator for μ. Suppose we calculate another statistic $t$ such that $\mathbb{E}\left[t\right]=\tau$ is a known value. Then

$$m^\star = m + c\left(t-\tau\right) \,$$

is also an unbiased estimator for $\mu$ for any choice of the coefficient $c$. The variance of the resulting estimator $m^{\star}$ is

$$\textrm{Var}\left(m^{\star}\right)=\textrm{Var}\left(m\right) + c^2\,\textrm{Var}\left(t\right) + 2c\,\textrm{Cov}\left(m,t\right).$$

By differentiating the above expression with respect to $c$, it can be shown that choosing the optimal coefficient

$$c^\star = - \frac{\textrm{Cov}\left(m,t\right)}{\textrm{Var}\left(t\right)}$$

minimizes the variance of $m^{\star}$. (Note that this coefficient is the same as the coefficient obtained from a linear regression.) With this choice,

$$\begin{align}
\textrm{Var}\left(m^{\star}\right) & =\textrm{Var}\left(m\right) - \frac{\left[\textrm{Cov}\left(m,t\right)\right]^2}{\textrm{Var}\left(t\right)} \\
& = \left(1-\rho_{m,t}^2\right)\textrm{Var}\left(m\right)
\end{align}$$

where

$$\rho_{m,t}=\textrm{Corr}\left(m,t\right) \,$$

is the correlation coefficient of $m$ and $t$. The greater the value of $\vert\rho_{m,t}\vert$, the greater the variance reduction achieved.

In the case that $\textrm{Cov}\left(m,t\right)$, $\textrm{Var}\left(t\right)$, and/or $\rho_{m,t}$ are unknown, they can be estimated across the Monte Carlo replicates. This is equivalent to solving a certain least squares system; therefore this technique is also known as regression sampling.

When the expectation of the control variable, $\mathbb{E}\left[t\right]=\tau$, is not known analytically, it is still possible to increase the precision in estimating $\mu$ (for a given fixed simulation budget), provided that the two conditions are met: 1) evaluating $t$ is significantly cheaper than computing $m$; 2) the magnitude of the correlation coefficient $|\rho_{m,t}|$ is close to unity.

== Example ==
We would like to estimate

$$I = \int_0^1 \frac{1}{1+x} \, \mathrm{d}x$$

using Monte Carlo integration. This integral is the expected value of $f(U)$, where

$$f(U) = \frac{1}{1+U}$$

and U follows a uniform distribution [0, 1]. Using a sample of size n denote the points in the sample as $u_1, \cdots, u_n$. Then the estimate is given by

$$I \approx \frac{1}{n} \sum_i f(u_i).$$

Now we introduce $g(U) = 1+U$ as a control variate with a known expected value $\mathbb{E}\left[g\left(U\right)\right]=\int_0^1 (1+x) \, \mathrm{d}x=\tfrac{3}{2}$ and combine the two into a new estimate

$$I \approx \frac{1}{n} \sum_i f(u_i)+c\left(\frac{1}{n}\sum_i g(u_i) -3/2\right).$$

Using $n=1500$ realizations and an estimated optimal coefficient $c^\star \approx 0.4773$ we obtain the following results

	Estimate	Variance
Classical estimate	0.69475	0.01947
Control variates	0.69295	0.00060

The variance was significantly reduced after using the control variates technique. (The exact result is $I=\ln 2 \approx 0.69314718$.)

== See also ==
- Antithetic variates
- Importance sampling
