= Transition path sampling =

Transition path sampling (TPS) is a rare-event sampling method used in computer simulations of rare events: physical or chemical transitions of a system from one stable state to another that occur too rarely to be observed on a computer timescale. Examples include protein folding, chemical reactions and nucleation. Standard simulation tools such as molecular dynamics can generate the dynamical trajectories of all the atoms in the system. However, because of the gap in accessible time-scales between simulation and reality, even present supercomputers might require years of simulations to show an event that occurs once per millisecond without some kind of acceleration.

== Transition path ensemble ==
TPS focuses on the most interesting part of the simulation, the transition. For example, an initially unfolded protein will vibrate for a long time in an open-string configuration before undergoing a transition and fold on itself. The aim of the method is to reproduce precisely those folding moments.

Consider in general a system with two stable states A and B. The system will spend a long time in those states and occasionally jump from one to the other. There are many ways in which the transition can take place. Once a probability is assigned to each of the many pathways, one can construct a Monte Carlo random walk in the path space of the transition trajectories, and thus generate the ensemble of all transition paths. All the relevant information can then be extracted from the ensemble, such as the reaction mechanism, the transition states, and the rate constants.

Given an initial path, TPS provides some algorithms to perturb that path and create a new one. As in all Monte Carlo walks, the new path will then be accepted or rejected in order to have the correct path probability. The procedure is iterated and the ensemble is gradually sampled.

A powerful and efficient algorithm is the so-called shooting move. Consider the case of a classical many-body system described by coordinates r and momenta p. Molecular dynamics generates a path as a set of (r_{t}, p_{t}) at discrete times t in [0,T] where T is the length of the path. For a transition from A to B, (r_{0}, p_{0}) is in A, and (r_{T}, p_{T}) is in B. One of the path times is chosen at random, the momenta p are modified slightly into p + δp, where δp is a random perturbation consistent with system constraints, e.g. conservation of energy and linear and angular momentum. A new trajectory is then simulated from this point, both backward and forward in time until one of the states is reached. Being in a transition region, this will not take long. If the new path still connects A to B it is accepted, otherwise it is rejected and the procedure starts again.

== Rate constant computation ==
In the Bennett–Chandler procedure, the rate constant k_{AB} for the transition from A to B is derived from the correlation function

$$C(t) = \frac{\langle h_A(0) h_B(t) \rangle}{\langle h_A \rangle}$$,

where h_{X} is the characteristic function of state X, and h_{X}(t) is either 1 if the system at time t is in state X or 0 if not. The time-derivative C'(t) starts at time 0 at the transition state theory (TST) value k_{AB}^{TST} and reaches a plateau k_{AB} ≤ k_{AB}^{TST} for times of the order of the transition time. Hence once the function is known up to these times, the rate constant is also available.

In the TPS framework C(t) can be rewritten as an average in the path ensemble

$$k_{AB}^{TPS}(t) = \frac{d}{dt}C(t) = \frac{\langle \dot{h_B(t)} \rangle_{AB}}{\langle h_B(t') \rangle_{AB}} C(t')$$,

where the subscript AB denotes an average in the ensemble of paths that start in A and visit B at least once. Time t' is an arbitrary time in the plateau region of C(t). The factor C(t') at this specific time can be computed with a combination of path sampling and umbrella sampling.

== Transition interface sampling ==
The TPS rate constant calculation can be improved in a variation of the method called Transition interface sampling (TIS). In this method the transition region is divided in subregions using interfaces. The first interface defines state A and the last state B. The interfaces are not physical interfaces but hypersurfaces in the phase space.

The rate constant can be viewed as a flux through these interfaces. The rate k_{AB} is the flux of trajectories starting before the first interface and going through the last interface. Being a rare event, the flux is very small and practically impossible to compute with a direct simulation. However, using the other interfaces between the states, one can rewrite the flux in terms of transition probabilities between interfaces

$k_{AB} = \Phi_{1,0} \prod_{i=1}^{n-1} P_A (i+1|i)$,

where P_{A}(i + 1|i) is the probability for trajectories, coming from state A and crossing interface i, to reach interface i + 1. Here interface 0 defines state A and interface n defines state B. The factor Φ_{1,0} is the flux through the interface closest to A. By making this interface close enough, the quantity can be computed with a standard simulation, as the crossing event through this interface is not a rare event any more.

Remarkably, in the formula above there is no Markov assumption of independent transition probabilities. The quantities P_{A}(i + 1|i) carry a subscript A to indicate that the probabilities are all dependent on the history of the path, all the way from when it left A. These probabilities can be computed with a path sampling simulation using the TPS shooting move. A path crossing interface i is perturbed and a new path is shot. If the path still starts from A and crosses interface i, is accepted. The probability P_{A}(i + 1|i) follows from the ratio of the number of paths that reach interface i + 1 to the total number of paths in the ensemble.

Theoretical considerations show that TIS computations are at least twice as fast as TPS, and computer experiments have shown that the TIS rate constant can converge up to 10 times faster. A reason for this is due to TIS using paths of adjustable length and on average shorter than TPS. Also, TPS relies on the correlation function C(t), computed by summation of positive and negative terms due to recrossings. TIS instead computes the rate as an effective positive flux, the quantity k_{AB} is directly computed as an average of only positive terms contributing to the interface transition probabilities.

== Time Dependent Processes ==
TPS/TIS as normally implemented can be acceptable for non-equilibrium calculations provided that the interfacial fluxes are time-independent (stationary). To treat non-stationary systems in which there is time dependence in the dynamics, due either to variation of an external parameter or to evolution of the system itself, then other rare-event methods may be needed, such as stochastic-process rare-event sampling.

== More references ==
For a review of TPS:

- Dellago, Christoph; Bolhuis, Peter G.; Geissler, Phillip L. (2002). "Transition Path Sampling". Advances in Chemical Physics. Vol. 123. pp. 1–84. doi:10.1002/0471231509.ch1. ISBN 978-0-471-21453-3.
- Bolhuis, Peter G.; Chandler, David; Dellago, Christoph; Geissler, Phillip L. (2002). "TRANSITION PATH SAMPLING: Throwing Ropes Over Rough Mountain Passes, in the Dark". Annual Review of Physical Chemistry. 53: 291–318. Bibcode:2002ARPC...53..291B. doi:10.1146/annurev.physchem.53.082301.113146. PMID 11972010.

For a review of TIS

- Moroni, D. (2005). "DARE". Efficient sampling of rare event pathways: from simple models to nucleation (Ph.D. thesis). Universiteit van Amsterdam. hdl:11245/1.240856.
