= Antithetic variates =

Monte Carlo method

In statistics, the antithetic variates method is a variance reduction technique used in Monte Carlo methods. Considering that the error in the simulated signal (using Monte Carlo methods) has a one-over square root convergence, a very large number of sample paths is required to obtain an accurate result. The antithetic variates method reduces the variance of the simulation results.

== Underlying principle ==
The antithetic variates technique consists, for every sample path obtained, in taking its antithetic path — that is given a path $\{\varepsilon_1,\dots,\varepsilon_M\}$ to also take $\{-\varepsilon_1,\dots,-\varepsilon_M\}$. The advantage of this technique is twofold: it reduces the number of normal samples to be taken to generate N paths, and it reduces the variance of the sample paths, improving the precision.

Suppose that we would like to estimate

$$\theta = \mathrm{E}( h(X) ) = \mathrm{E}( Y ) \,$$

For that we have generated two samples

$$Y_1\text{ and }Y_2 \,$$

An unbiased estimate of ${\theta}$ is given by

$$\hat \theta = \frac{Y_1 + Y_2}{2}.$$

And

$$\text{Var}(\hat \theta) = \frac{\text{Var}(Y_1) + \text{Var}(Y_2) + 2\text{Cov}(Y_1,Y_2)}{4}$$

so variance is reduced if $\text{Cov}(Y_1,Y_2)$ is negative.

== Example 1 ==
If the law of the variable X follows a uniform distribution along [0, 1], the first sample will be $u_1, \ldots, u_n$, where, for any given i, $u_i$ is obtained from U(0, 1). The second sample is built from $u'_1, \ldots, u'_n$, where, for any given i: $u'_i = 1-u_i$. If the set $u_i$ is uniform along [0, 1], so are $u'_i$. Furthermore, covariance is negative, allowing for initial variance reduction.

== Example 2: integral calculation ==
We would like to estimate

$$I = \int_0^1 \frac{1}{1+x} \, \mathrm{d}x.$$

The exact result is $I=\ln 2 \approx 0.69314718$. This integral can be seen as the expected value of $f(U)$, where

$$f(x) = \frac{1}{1+x}$$

and U follows a uniform distribution [0, 1].

The following table compares the classical Monte Carlo estimate (sample size: 2n, where n = 1500) to the antithetic variates estimate (sample size: n, completed with the transformed sample 1 − u_{i}):

	Estimate	standard error
Classical Estimate	0.69365	0.00255
Antithetic Variates	0.69399	0.00063

The use of the antithetic variates method to estimate the result shows an important variance reduction.

== See also ==
- Control variates
