= Rare event sampling =

Rare event sampling is an umbrella term for a group of computer simulation methods intended to selectively sample 'special' regions of the dynamic space of systems which are unlikely to visit those special regions through brute-force simulation. A familiar example of a rare event in this context would be nucleation of a raindrop from over-saturated water vapour: although raindrops form every day, relative to the length and time scales defined by the motion of water molecules in the vapour phase, the formation of a liquid droplet is extremely rare.

Due to the wide use of computer simulation across very different domains, articles on the topic arise from quite disparate sources and it is difficult to make a coherent survey of rare event sampling techniques. Contemporary methods include transition-path sampling (TPS), replica exchange transition interface sampling (RETIS), repetitive simulation trials after reaching thresholds (RESTART), forward flux sampling (FFS), generalized splitting, adaptive multilevel splitting (AMS), stochastic-process rare-event sampling (SPRES), line sampling, subset simulation, and weighted ensemble (WE). The first published rare event technique was by Herman Kahn and Theodore Edward Harris in 1951, who in turn referred to an unpublished technical report by John von Neumann and Stanislaw Ulam.

== Time dependence ==
If a system is out of thermodynamic equilibrium, then it is possible that there will be time-dependence in the rare event flux. In order to follow the time evolution of the probability of a rare event, it is necessary to maintain a steady current of trajectories into the target region of configurational space. SPRES is specifically designed for this eventuality and AMS is also at least formally valid for applications in which this is required.

In cases where a dissipative steady state obtains (i.e. the conditions for thermodynamic equilibrium are not met, but the rare event flux is nonetheless constant) then FFS and other methods can be appropriate as well as the typically more expensive full-nonequilibrium approaches.

== Landscape methods ==
If the assumption of thermodynamic equilibrium is made, then there is no time-dependence in the rare event flux and a thermodynamic rather than statistical approach to the problem may be more appropriate. These methods are generally thought of separately to rare event methods, but may address the same problems. In these strategies, a free energy landscape (or an energy landscape, for small systems) is prepared. For a small system this landscape may be mapped entirely, while for a system with a larger number of degrees of freedom a projection onto some set of progress coordinates will still be required.

Having mapped the landscape, and making certain assumptions, transition-state theory can then be used to yield a description of the probabilities of paths within it. An example method for mapping landscapes is replica exchange simulation, which has the advantage when applied to rare event problems that piecewise correct trajectory fragments are generated in the course of the method, allowing some direct analysis of the dynamic behaviour even without generating the full landscape.

== See also ==
- Rare events

== Related software ==
- R package mistral (CRAN and dev version) for rare event simulation tools
- WESTPA and wepy are packages for Weighted Ensemble.
- The Python toolset freshs.org as an example toolkit for distributing FFS and SPRES calculations to run sampling trials concurrently on parallel hardware or in a distributed manner across the network.
- PyRETIS is an open-source Python library for molecular rare-event simulations based primarily on transition interface sampling (TIS) and replica exchange transition interface sampling (RETIS). PyRETIS controls molecular-dynamics trajectories in order to sample rare transitions while preserving unbiased dynamics, and has been interfaced with molecular simulation packages including GROMACS, LAMMPS, OpenMM, and CP2K. Later versions introduced a more modular architecture, additional path-sampling strategies, support for long-lived metastable states and transitions with unbounded state definitions, and integrated post-processing tools. The package implements standard shooting moves as well as subtrajectory Monte Carlo moves such as Stone Skipping, Web Throwing, and Wire Fencing. Stone Skipping and Web Throwing were introduced as path-generating moves designed to improve decorrelation in path-sampling simulations, whereas Wire Fencing was later developed as a more general subtrajectory move for cases in which the order parameter is expensive to evaluate or difficult to determine locally. The PyRETIS documentation also provides an introduction to PyRETIS and rare-event methods and worked examples, including a tutorial for subtrajectory moves in a one-dimensional potential.
- PyRETIS has been used in molecular case studies including H-NS binding to AT-rich DNA, water autoionization, and path sampling of atmospheric reactions. Additional applications and input files are listed on the project's scientific results page.
- PyVisA is a visualization and analysis tool for path-sampling trajectories and PyRETIS outputs. It provides tools for inspecting path ensembles, plotting collective variables, and post-processing path-sampling simulations.
