= G. Peter Lepage =

Canadian American theoretical physicist

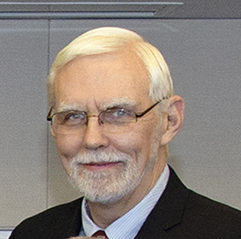
- Lepage at 2017 National Science Board
- Born: Gerard Peter Lepage; 13 April 1952 (age 74); Canada
- Education: McGill University (B.Sc. (Hons.) 1972); University of Cambridge (M.A.St 1973); Stanford University (Ph.D. 1978)
- Known for: Harold Tanner Dean of the Cornell University College of Arts and Sciences (2003–2013); VEGAS algorithm
- Spouse: Deborah O'Connor
- Children: 3
- Awards: Sakurai Prize
- Scientific career
- Fields: Theoretical physics
- Workplaces: Cornell University
- Doctoral advisor: Stanley Brodsky
- Doctoral students: Paul Mackenzie

G. Peter Lepage (born 13 April 1952) is a Canadian American theoretical physicist and an academic administrator. He was the Harold Tanner Dean of the College of Arts and Sciences at Cornell University from 2003 to 2013.

== Early life and education ==
Gerard Peter Lepage was born in Canada in 1952. Lepage studied at McGill University and graduated with a bachelor's degree in honours physics in 1972 and the University of Cambridge with a master's degree (M.A.St - Part III of the Mathematical Tripos) in 1973. In 1978, he received his PhD in theoretical physics from Stanford University.

== Academic career ==
Lepage was a research associate at the Stanford Linear Accelerator Center in 1978. He was a postdoctoral research associate at the Laboratory of Nuclear Studies, Cornell University from 1978 to 1980. In 1980, he joined the physics faculty at Cornell University where he became a professor. He received academic tenure in 1984 after only four years on the university faculty. From 1999 to 2003, he was the chair of Cornell's physics department. He was appointed the Harold Tanner Dean of the College of Arts and Sciences, serving from 2003 to 2013.

He is a Fellow of the American Academy of Arts and Sciences and a Fellow of the American Physical Society. He was previously an Alfred P. Sloan Fellow (1983–85; 1990) and John Simon Guggenheim Fellow (1996–97) Since 2012 he has been a member of the National Science Board.

G. Peter Lepage has been a visiting scholar at a number of institutions: the Institute for Advanced Study, Princeton; Department of Applied Mathematics and Theoretical Physics, Cambridge; the University of California Institute of Theoretical Physics, Santa Barbara, the Fermi National Accelerator Center near Chicago, and the Institute for Nuclear Theory, Seattle.

He was on the editorial board of Physical Review D and Physical Review Letters and received the Outstanding Referee Award from the APS in 2009. He has served on the scientific program committees for the Stanford Linear Accelerator Center, the DOE-NSF National Computational Infrastructure for Lattice Gauge Theory, the NSF's Institute for Nuclear Theory in Seattle, the International Particle Data Group, and the NSF's Institute for Theoretical Physics in Santa Barbara.

He was the co-chair of the working group for the President Obama’s Council of Advisors on Science and Technology (PCAST) on STEM teaching at colleges and universities, which in 2012 produced the acclaimed report, “Engage to Excel: Producing One Million Additional College Graduates with Degrees in Science, Technology, Engineering, and Mathematics.” He has served on the technical advisory committee for the Association of American Universities’ Undergraduate STEM Education Initiative, and is vice chair of the National Science Board’s Committee on Education and Human Resources.

He is also involved in innovations in pedagogy, especially physics education at all levels. He spearheads the Active Learning Initiative (ALI) in Cornell's college of arts and sciences, a five-year pilot project, funded by 1987 alumni, Alex and Laura Hanson, used to enhance strategies for interactive classroom learning using emerging technologies.

=== Research ===
In the late 1970s and early 1980s, he was known for his research with Stanley Brodsky on quantum chromodynamics (QCD) and perturbation theory of scattering processes, His research focus examines high precision calculations, adapted to renormalization techniques and effective field theory. This method is then applied to the fields of QCD in atomic physics, computational quantum field theory, condensed matter physics, nuclear physics (little body problem), systems of heavy quarks and exclusive scattering processes with high momentum transfer.

His research also covers high-performance computing (HPC) or large scale numerical simulations of non-perturbative lattice QCD, leading in part to a range of calculations at different observation sizes – quarks, gluons and hadron masses, coupling constants and mixing angles in the Standard Model, magnetic moment of muons and allowed to determine the QCD contributions for precision testing of the Standard Model (distinguishable from possible contributions of new physics beyond the standard model). These particles describe the inner structure of protons, neutrons and other sub-nuclear particles. His research resulted in the VEGAS algorithm for adaptive method for reducing error in Monte Carlo simulations in interaction physics by using a known or approximate probability distribution function.

In 2016, Lepage received the J. J. Sakurai Prize from the American Physical Society for “innovative applications of quantum field theory in elementary particle physics, in particular for the justification of the theory of exclusive processes, the development of nonrelativistic effective field theories and the determination of parameters of the standard model with lattice theories.”

He has authored more than 250 scientific publications. In 2002, together with fellow academics, Carolyn (Biddy) Martin and Mohsen Mostafavi, he co-edited a book on the future and relevance of the humanities, “Do the Humanities Have to Be Useful?”

== Personal life ==
G. Peter Lepage is married to Deborah O'Connor and they have three sons: Michael, Daniel and Matthew. O'Connor studied pharmacology at Stanford, worked in biochemistry at Cornell and served on the Ithaca City School District Board of Education.
