= Paul Mackenzie (physicist) =

Physicist

Paul B. Mackenzie (born 1950) is a theoretical physicist at the Fermi National Accelerator Laboratory. He did graduate work in physics at Cornell University where he was a student of G. Peter Lepage. He is an expert on Lattice Gauge Theory. He is the chair of the Executive Committee of USQCD, the US collaboration for developing the necessary supercomputing hardware and software for quantum chromodynamics formulated on a lattice.

== Selected publications ==
Mackenzie's has published 71 scientific papers listed in the INSPIRE-HEP Literature Database. The most widely cited of them, "Viability of lattice perturbation theory" in Physical Review D 48 (5), pp. 2250–2264 (1993) has been cited 589 times by March 2009. The second most widely cited, "On the elimination of scale ambiguities in perturbative quantum chromodynamics " Physical Review D 28 (1), pp. 228–235 (1983) has been cited 406 times. Both papers are with Lepage, and the second also with Stan Brodsky.
