= Monte Carlo molecular modeling =

Monte Carlo molecular modelling is the application of Monte Carlo methods to molecular problems. These problems can also be modelled by the molecular dynamics method. The difference is that this approach relies on equilibrium statistical mechanics rather than molecular dynamics. Instead of trying to reproduce the dynamics of a system, it generates states according to appropriate Boltzmann distribution. Thus, it is the application of the Metropolis Monte Carlo simulation to molecular systems. It is therefore also a particular subset of the more general Monte Carlo method in statistical physics.

It employs a Markov chain procedure in order to determine a new state for a system from a previous one. According to its stochastic nature, this new state is accepted at random. Each trial usually counts as a move. The avoidance of dynamics restricts the method to studies of static quantities only, but the freedom to choose moves makes the method very flexible. These moves must only satisfy a basic condition of balance in order for the equilibrium to be properly described, but detailed balance, a stronger condition, is usually imposed when designing new algorithms. An additional advantage is that some systems, such as the Ising model, lack a dynamical description and are only defined by an energy prescription; for these the Monte Carlo approach is the only one feasible.

The great success of this method in statistical mechanics has led to various generalizations such as the method of simulated annealing for optimization, in which a fictitious temperature is introduced and then gradually lowered.

A range of software packages have been developed specifically for the use of the Metropolis Monte Carlo method on molecular simulations. These include:

- BOSS
- CP2K
- MCPro
- Sire
- ProtoMS
- Faunus

== See also ==
- Quantum Monte Carlo
- Monte Carlo method in statistical physics
- List of software for Monte Carlo molecular modeling
- Software for molecular mechanics modeling
- Bond fluctuation model
