= Stochastic process rare event sampling =

Stochastic-process rare event sampling (SPRES) is a rare-event sampling method in computer simulation, designed specifically for non-equilibrium calculations, including those for which the rare-event rates are time-dependent (non-stationary process). To treat systems in which there is time dependence in the dynamics, due either to variation of an external parameter or to evolution of the system itself, the scheme for branching paths must be devised so as to achieve sampling which is distributed evenly in time and which takes account of changing fluxes through different regions of the phase space.

== Algorithm summary ==
The SPRES algorithm branches simulation paths at fixed time intervals. The process of branching requires that identical paths can be made to diverge from each other, such as by changing the seed in the computer's random number generator. For systems which would be naturally considered as deterministic, it may be possible to inject an element of randomness, for instance by coupling to a fluctuating heat bath or by adding random perturbations to account for some elements of the simulation which are not modelled explicitly but which exist in the real system.

The amount of over or under-sampling (the branching density) is decided based on some system-specific 'progress coordinate' which measures progress toward a rare event of interest. The probability of selecting a configuration as the starting point for a new path segment is conditioned jointly by its probability of appearing in an unbiased simulation and by the local flux forwards in the progress coordinate, with a small flux leading adaptively to a larger oversampling.

The method is designed to allow ready observation of rare events with respect to time. An additional benefit relative to methods which mainly split trajectories based on interfaces in the progress coordinate rather than on time is that over most of the progress coordinate space the coordinate only needs to be evaluated at fixed time intervals (rather than continuously) because the exact time-point at which interfaces other than the final interface are reached is no longer of importance.

== See also ==
- Umbrella sampling
