= INTLAB =

INTLAB (Interval Laboratory)
- Original author(s): S.M. Rump
- Developer(s): S.M. Rump; Cleve Moler; Shinichi Oishi etc.
- Written in: MATLAB/GNU Octave
- Operating system: Unix, Microsoft Windows, macOS
- Available in: English
- Type: Validated numerics Computer-assisted proof Interval arithmetic Affine arithmetic Numerical linear algebra Root-finding algorithms Numerical integration Automatic differentiation Numerical methods for ordinary differential equations
- Website: www.tuhh.de/ti3/intlab/

INTLAB (INTerval LABoratory) is an interval arithmetic library using MATLAB and GNU Octave, available in Windows and Linux, macOS. It was developed by S.M. Rump from Hamburg University of Technology. INTLAB was used to develop other MATLAB-based libraries such as VERSOFT and INTSOLVER, and it was used to solve some problems in the Hundred-dollar, Hundred-digit Challenge problems.

== Version history ==
- 12/30/1998 Version 1
- 03/06/1999 Version 2
- 11/16/1999 Version 3
  - 03/07/2002 Version 3.1
- 12/08/2002 Version 4
  - 12/27/2002 Version 4.1
  - 01/22/2003 Version 4.1.1
  - 11/18/2003 Version 4.1.2
- 04/04/2004 Version 5
  - 06/04/2005 Version 5.1
  - 12/20/2005 Version 5.2
  - 05/26/2006 Version 5.3
  - 05/31/2007 Version 5.4
  - 11/05/2008 Version 5.5
- 05/08/2009 Version 6
- 12/12/2012 Version 7
  - 06/24/2013 Version 7.1
- 05/10/2014 Version 8
- 01/22/2015 Version 9
  - 12/07/2016 Version 9.1
- 05/29/2017 Version 10
  - 07/24/2017 Version 10.1
  - 12/15/2017 Version 10.2
- 01/07/2019 Version 11
- 03/06/2020 Version 12

== Functionality ==
INTLAB can help users to solve the following mathematical/numerical problems with interval arithmetic.

- Numerical linear algebra (Not only solving matrix systems or eigenvalue problems, INTLAB can handle the least squares, Hessian matrix, and verify the positive definiteness of a given matrix)
- Root-finding algorithms
- Affine arithmetic
- Solving ODEs rigorously (This feature includes external tools such as the AWA toolbox and the Taylor model toolbox)
- Automatic differentiation
- Numerical integration
- Fast Fourier transform
- Rigorously compute the gamma function

== Works cited by INTLAB ==
INTLAB is based on the previous studies of the main author, including his works with co-authors.

- S. M. Rump: Fast and Parallel Interval Arithmetic, BIT Numerical Mathematics 39(3), 539–560, 1999.
- S. Oishi, S. M. Rump: Fast verification of solutions of matrix equations, Numerische Mathematik 90, 755–773, 2002.
- T. Ogita, S. M. Rump, and S. Oishi. Accurate Sum and Dot Product, SIAM Journal on Scientific Computing (SISC), 26(6):1955–1988, 2005.
- S.M. Rump, T. Ogita, and S. Oishi. Fast High Precision Summation. Nonlinear Theory and Its Applications (NOLTA), IEICE, 1(1), 2010.
- S.M. Rump: Ultimately Fast Accurate Summation, SIAM Journal on Scientific Computing (SISC), 31(5):3466–3502, 2009.
- S.M. Rump, T. Ogita, and S. Oishi: Accurate Floating-point Summation I: Faithful Rounding. SIAM Journal on Scientific Computing (SISC), 31(1): 189–224, 2008.
- S. M. Rump, T. Ogita, and S. Oishi: Accurate Floating-point Summation II: Sign, K-fold Faithful and Rounding to Nearest. SIAM Journal on Scientific Computing (SISC), 31(2):1269–1302, 2008.
- S. M. Rump: Ultimately Fast Accurate Summation, SIAM Journal on Scientific Computing (SISC), 31(5):3466–3502, 2009.
- S. M. Rump. Accurate solution of dense linear systems, Part II: Algorithms using directed rounding. Journal of Computational and Applied Mathematics (JCAM), 242:185–212, 2013.
- S. M. Rump. Verified Bounds for Least Squares Problems and Underdetermined Linear Systems. SIAM Journal of Matrix Analysis and Applications (SIMAX), 33(1):130–148, 2012.
- S. M. Rump: Improved componentwise verified error bounds for least squares problems and underdetermined linear systems, Numerical Algorithms, 66:309–322, 2013.
- R. Krawzcyk, A. Neumaier: Interval slopes for rational functions and associated centered forms, SIAM Journal on Numerical Analysis 22, 604–616 (1985)
- S. M. Rump: Expansion and Estimation of the Range of Nonlinear Functions, Mathematics of Computation 65(216), pp. 1503–1512, 1996.

== See also ==
- List of numerical analysis software
- Comparison of linear algebra libraries
