= Tapered floating point =

Variant of floating-point numbers in computers

In computing, tapered floating point (TFP) is a format similar to floating point, but with variable-sized entries for the significand and exponent instead of the fixed-length entries found in normal floating-point formats. In addition to this, tapered floating-point formats provide a fixed-size pointer entry indicating the number of digits in the exponent entry. The number of digits of the significand entry (including the sign) results from the difference of the fixed total length minus the length of the exponent and pointer entries.

Thus numbers with a small exponent, i.e. whose order of magnitude is close to the one of 1, have a higher relative precision than those with a large exponent.

== History ==
The tapered floating-point scheme was first proposed by Robert Morris of Bell Laboratories in 1971, and refined with leveling by Masao Iri and Shouichi Matsui of University of Tokyo in 1981, and by Hozumi Hamada of Hitachi, Ltd.

Alan Feldstein of Arizona State University and Peter Turner of Clarkson University described a tapered scheme resembling a conventional floating-point system except for the overflow or underflow conditions.

In 2013, John Gustafson proposed the Unum number system, a variant of tapered floating-point arithmetic with an exact bit added to the representation and some interval interpretation to the non-exact values.

== See also ==
- Logarithmic number system (LNS)
- Symmetric level-index arithmetic (SLI)
