= John Gustafson =

John Gustafson may refer to:

- John Gustafson (musician) (1942–2014), bassist and vocalist
- John Gustafson (scientist) (born 1955), computer scientist and inventor of Gustafson's law
