= Universal number =

Universal numbers can refer to:

- Universal Numbering System
- universal numbers (data format)
