= Bin Dong (mathematician) =

AI for Mathematics Professor

- 董彬
- Education: Peking University (BSc); National University of Singapore (MSc); University of California, Los Angeles (PhD)
- Known for: PDE-Net; AI for Mathematics
- Awards: Qiu Shi Outstanding Young Scholar Award (2014); Wang Xuan Outstanding Young Scholar Award (2023)
- Scientific career
- Fields: AI4Math; Machine learning Scientific computing Computational imaging
- Workplaces: Peking University

Bin Dong (Chinese: 董彬) is a Chinese applied mathematician and Boya Distinguished Professor at the Beijing International Center for Mathematical Research of Peking University. He works on AI for mathematics, scientific computing, machine learning and computational imaging.

In 2022 he was an invited speaker in the Statistics and Data Analysis section of the International Congress of Mathematicians.

== Education and career ==
Dong graduated from the School of Mathematical Sciences at Peking University in 2003, received a master's degree from the National University of Singapore in 2005, and completed a PhD in mathematics at the University of California, Los Angeles in 2009.

He held positions at the University of California, San Diego and, from 2011 to 2014, the University of Arizona, before returning to China at the end of 2014 to join Peking University. He is also deputy director of the university's Center for Machine Learning Research, and since 2024 has been executive vice president of the Beijing Zhongguancun Academy, a graduate institution for artificial intelligence research established by China's Ministry of Education and the Beijing municipal government.

Dong sits on the editorial boards of the SIAM Journal on Scientific Computing and the SIAM Journal on Imaging Sciences, among other journals, and was a member of the organizing committee of the 2024 SIAM Conference on Imaging Science.

== Research ==
Dong's early work established theoretical connections between partial differential equation and variational methods on the one hand and wavelet and wavelet-frame methods on the other, two approaches in image science that had developed largely independently. A 2012 paper with Jian-Feng Cai, Stanley Osher and Zuowei Shen in the Journal of the American Mathematical Society set out this correspondence for image restoration; the work revised some established views of the relationship between the two approaches and led to new restoration algorithms.

He subsequently drew a correspondence between numerical schemes for differential equations and deep neural network architectures, producing PDE-Net, a network that recovers an unknown governing partial differential equation from observational data while remaining predictive.

=== Artificial intelligence for mathematics ===
From 2023 Dong created an AI4Math group at Peking University working on the formalisation of mathematics and automated theorem proving in Lean 4.

In April 2026 the group announced that a two-agent system it had built had disproved a conjecture in commutative algebra posed by the American mathematician D. D. Anderson in 2014, together with a machine-checked Lean 4 formalisation of the counterexample. Xinhua described it as the first instance in China of an AI framework resolving an open problem in commutative algebra alongside a large-scale formal verification.

== Awards ==
- Qiu Shi Outstanding Young Scholar Award (2014)
- New Cornerstone Investigator (2023)
- Wang Xuan Outstanding Young Scholar Award (2023), awarded jointly by Peking University, the China Computer Federation and the China Society for Industrial and Applied Mathematics

== Selected publications ==
- Cai, Jian-Feng; Dong, Bin; Osher, Stanley; Shen, Zuowei (2012). "Image restoration: Total variation, wavelet frames, and beyond". Journal of the American Mathematical Society. 25 (4): 1033–1089. Bibcode:2012JAMS...25.1033C. doi:10.1090/S0894-0347-2012-00740-1.
- Dong, Bin; Jiang, Qingtang; Shen, Zuowei (2017). "Image restoration: Wavelet frame shrinkage, nonlinear evolution PDEs, and beyond". Multiscale Modeling & Simulation. 15 (1): 606–660. doi:10.1137/15M1037457.
- Long, Zichao; Lu, Yiping; Dong, Bin (2019). "PDE-Net 2.0: Learning PDEs from data with a numeric-symbolic hybrid deep network". Journal of Computational Physics. 399 108925. arXiv:1812.04426. Bibcode:2019JCoPh.39908925L. doi:10.1016/j.jcp.2019.108925.
