= Hierarchical INTegration =

Hierarchical INTegration, or HINT for short, is a computer benchmark that ranks a computer system as a whole: the entire computer instead of individual components. It measures the full range of performance, mostly based on the amount of work a computer can perform over time. A system with a very fast processor would likely be rated poorly if the buses were very poor compared to those of another system that had both an average processor and average buses. For example, in the past, Macintosh computers with relatively slow processor speeds (800 MHz) used to perform better than x86 based systems with processors running at nearly 2 GHz.

HINT is known for being almost immune to artificial optimization and can be used by many computers ranging from a calculator to a supercomputer. It was developed at the United States Department of Energy's Ames Laboratory and is free and open-source software, licensed under the terms of the GNU General Public License.

HINT is intended to be scalable to run on any size computer, from small serial systems to highly parallel supercomputers. The HINT benchmark can use any floating-point or integer data type.

HINT benchmark results have been published comparing a variety of parallel and uniprocessor systems.

A related tool ANALYTIC HINT can be used as a design tool to estimate the benefits of using more memory, a faster processor, or improved communications (bus speed) within the system.

== See also ==
- John Gustafson (scientist)
