= Eldon Hansen =

American mathematician (born 1927)

Eldon Robert Hansen (born 1927) is an American mathematician and author who has published in global optimization theory and interval arithmetic.

Hansen was born on July 16, 1927 in Rochester, Washington. After receiving bachelor's and master's degrees at the University of California, Berkeley in 1950 and 1952, and working at the University of California Radiation Laboratory from 1952 until 1956, he received his Ph.D. in mathematics from Stanford University in 1960 with a dissertation on Jacobi methods and Block-Jacobi methods for computing matrix eigenvalues, supervised by George Forsythe. He worked for the Lockheed Missiles and Space Company beginning in 1956. He later held a position at Washington State University, and supervised a doctoral student there.

His books include:

- Global Optimization Using Interval Analysis (Marcel Dekker, 1992; 2nd ed. with William G. Walster, 2004)
- A Table of Series and Products (Prentice-Hall, 1975)
- Topics in Interval Analysis (edited, Clarendon Press, 1969)
