= Hundred-dollar, Hundred-digit Challenge problems =

Problems in numerical mathematics

The Hundred-dollar, Hundred-digit Challenge problems are 10 problems in numerical mathematics published in 2002 by Nick Trefethen (2002). A $100 prize was offered to whoever produced the most accurate solutions, measured up to 10 significant digits. The deadline for the contest was May 20, 2002. In the end, 20 teams solved all of the problems perfectly within the required precision, and an anonymous donor aided in producing the required prize monies. The challenge and its solutions were described in detail in the book (Folkmar Bornemann, Dirk Laurie & Stan Wagon et al. 2004).

== The problems ==
From (Trefethen 2002):

1. $\lim_{\varepsilon \to 0}\int_\varepsilon^1 x^{-1} \cos\left(x^{-1} \log x\right)\,dx$
2. A photon moving at speed 1 in the xy-plane starts at t = 0 at (x, y) = (0.5, 0.1) heading due east. Around every integer lattice point (i, j) in the plane, a circular mirror of radius 1/3 has been erected. How far from the origin is the photon at t = 10?
3. The infinite matrix A with entries $a_{11}=1, a_{12}=1/2, a_{21}=1/3, a_{13}=1/4, a_{22}=1/5, a_{31}=1/6, \dots$ is a bounded operator on $\ell^2$. What is $||A||$?
4. What is the global minimum of the function $\exp\left(\sin\left(50x\right)\right) + \sin\left(60e^y\right) + \sin\left(70 \sin x\right)+\sin\left(\sin\left(80y\right)\right) - \sin\left(10\left(x+y\right)\right) + 1/4\left(x^2 + y^2\right)$
5. Let $f(z)=1/\Gamma(z)$, where $\Gamma(z)$ is the gamma function, and let $p(z)$ be the cubic polynomial that best approximates $f(z)$ on the unit disk in the supremum norm $||.||_\infty$. What is $||f-p||_\infty$?
6. A flea starts at $(0,0)$ on the infinite 2D integer lattice and executes a biased random walk: At each step it hops north or south with probability $1/4$, east with probability $1/4+\varepsilon$, and west with probability $1/4-\varepsilon$. The probability that the flea returns to (0, 0) sometime during its wanderings is $1/2$. What is $\varepsilon$?
7. Let A be the 20000×20000 matrix whose entries are zero everywhere except for the primes 2, 3, 5, 7, ..., 224737 along the main diagonal and the number 1 in all the positions $a_{ij}$ with $|i-j|=1, 2, 4, 8, \dots, 16384$. What is the (1, 1) entry of $A^{-1}$?
8. A square plate $[-1,1]\times [-1,1]$ is at temperature $u=0$. At time $t=0$, the temperature is increased to $u=5$ along one of the four sides while being held at $u=0$ along the other three sides, and heat then flows into the plate according to $u_{t} = \Delta u$. When does the temperature reach $u=1$ at the center of the plate?
9. The integral $I(\alpha)=\int_0^2\left[2+\sin\left(10\alpha\right)\right]x^\alpha \sin\left(\alpha/\left(2-x\right)\right)\,dx$ depends on the parameter α. What is the value of α in [0, 5] at which I(α) achieves its maximum?
10. A particle at the center of a 10×1 rectangle undergoes Brownian motion (i.e., 2D random walk with infinitesimal step lengths) till it hits the boundary. What is the probability that it hits at one of the ends rather than at one of the sides?

== Solutions ==
1. 0.3233674316
2. 0.9952629194
3. 1.274224152
4. −3.306868647
5. 0.2143352345
6. 0.06191395447
7. 0.7250783462
8. 0.4240113870
9. 0.7859336743
10. 3.837587979 × 10^{−7}

These answers have been assigned the identifiers OEIS: A117231, OEIS: A117232, OEIS: A117233, OEIS: A117234, OEIS: A117235, OEIS: A117236, OEIS: A117237, OEIS: A117238, OEIS: A117239, and OEIS: A117240 in the On-Line Encyclopedia of Integer Sequences.
