= Willard L. Miranker =

American mathematician

Willard L. Miranker (March 8, 1932 – April 28, 2011) was an American mathematician and computer scientist known for his contributions to applied mathematics and numerical mathematics.

== Early life and education ==
Miranker was raised in Brooklyn, New York. He received a bachelor of arts in 1952, master of science in 1953 and Ph.D. in 1957 all in mathematics from the Courant Institute at New York University. His doctoral thesis The Asymptotic Theory of Solutions of U + (K^{2})U = 0 was advised by Joseph Keller.

== Career ==
=== Mathematics ===
Upon graduating from New York University, he worked for the mathematics department at Bell Labs (1956–1958) before joining IBM Research (1961). Upon retirement from IBM, he joined the computer science faculty at Yale University (1989) as research faculty.

He also held professor affiliations at California Institute of Technology (1963), City University of New York (1966–1967), Hebrew University of Jerusalem (1968), New York University (1970–1973), Yale University (1973) and University of Paris-Sud (1974).

Miranker's work includes articles and books on stiff differential equations, interval arithmetic, analog computing, and neural networks and the modeling of consciousness.

=== Painting ===
Miranker was also an accomplished and prolific painter. Over the course of his life, Willard Miranker painted ~4000 watercolors/aquarelles and ~200 oil paintings. He exhibited internationally in New York City, Paris and Bonn.

== Awards ==
- Fellow of the American Association for the Advancement of Science
