= Ulrich Kulisch =

German mathematician

Ulrich W. Kulisch (born 1933 in Breslau) is a German mathematician specializing in numerical analysis, including the computer implementation of interval arithmetic.

== Experience ==
After graduation from high school in Freising, Kulisch studied mathematics at LMU Munich and the Technical University of Munich where in 1961 he completed his dissertation (Behandlung von Differentialgleichungen im Komplexen auf dem elektronischen Analogrechner) under Josef Heinhold. After his postdoctoral qualification in 1963, he was acting Professor for Numerical Mathematics of LMU Munich from 1964 to 1966, and from 1966 Professor of Mathematics and Director of the Institute of Applied Mathematics at the University of Karlsruhe.

During his time in academia, Kulisch spent several sabbaticals abroad. He spent time in 1969/1970 at the Mathematics Research Center of the University of Wisconsin–Madison under Ramon Edgar Moore; in 1972/1973 and 1978/1979 at IBM's Thomas J. Watson Research Center in Yorktown Heights (where he worked alongside Willard L. Miranker (1932–2011)); and in 1998 and 1999/2000 at the Electrotechnical Laboratory at the University of Tsukuba.

Kulisch was one of the pioneers of interval arithmetic in Germany in the 1960s and helped to found the discipline, along with Karl Nickel and Fritz Krückeberg. His implementations of interval arithmetic in computers started with Algol in the 1960s. Kulisch developed software with automated results verification including Nixdorf Computer (Pascal-XSC and others), IBM (projects ACRITH and ACRITH-XSC) and Siemens (program package ARITHMOS). In Karlsruhe, he developed C-XSC and associated program libraries. In 1993/1994 he was also involved in a hardware implementation on the XPA 3233 vector arithmetic coprocessor.

He was a founding member of the Computer Science Association in 1968, was chairman of the Computer Mathematics and Scientific Computing Committee of the Gesellschaft für Angewandte Mathematik und Mechanik (GAMM) and of the Technical Committees Enhanced Computer Arithmetic of the International Association for Mathematics and Computers in Simulation (IMACS) 1979 German member of the Working Group 2.5 (Numerical Software) of the International Federation for Information Processing (IFIP), of which he has been a member since 1980. He is on IEEE Standard Committee P1788 for interval arithmetic.

From 1975 to 1998 he was editor of the Bibliographisches Institut's Jahrbuchs Überblicke Mathematik.

== Bibliography ==
- "Grundlagen des Numerischen Rechnens – Mathematische Begründung der Rechnerarithmetik", Reihe Informatik 19, BI 1976
- "Grundzüge der Intervallrechnung", Jahrbuch Überblicke Mathematik, volume 2, BI, Mannheim 1969
- with Willard L. Miranker (editor): A New Approach to Scientific Computation, Academic Press, New York, 1983.
- with Willard L. Miranker: "The arithmetic of the digital computer: a new approach", SIAM Rev. 28 (1986) 1–40.
- with H. J. Stetter (editor), "Scientific Computation with Automatic Result Verification", Computing Supplementum, volume 6, Springer, Wien, 1988.
- Editor: Wissenschaftliches Rechnen mit Ergebnisverifikation, Vieweg 1989
- with Willard L. Miranker: Computer Arithmetic in Theory and Practice, Academic Press 1981
- with R. Klatte, M. Neaga, D. Ratz, Ch. Ullrich: Pascal XSC- Sprachbeschreibung mit Beispielen, Springer 1991 (English edition, Springer 1992)
- with R. Hammer, M. Hocks, D. Ratz: C++ Toolbox for Verified Computing, Springer 1995
- Computer, Arithmetik und Numerik – ein Memorandum, Überblicke Mathematik, Vieweg 1998
- Advanced Arithmetic for the Digital Computer – Design of Arithmetic Units, Springer-Verlag 2002
- Computer Arithmetic and Validity – Theory, Implementation, and Applications, de Gruyter 2008, 2nd edition, 2013
