= Error bar =

Graphical representations of the variability of data

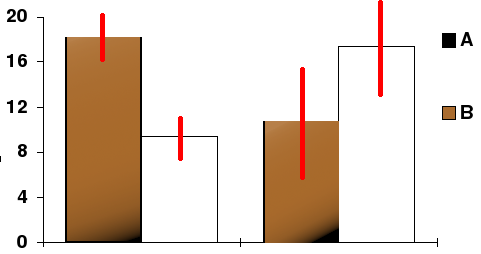
A bar chart with confidence intervals (shown as red lines)

Error bars are graphical representations of the variability of data and used on graphs to indicate the error or uncertainty in a reported measurement. They give a general idea of how precise a measurement is, or conversely, how far from the reported value the true (error free) value might be. Error bars often represent one standard deviation of uncertainty, one standard error, or a particular confidence interval (e.g., a 95% interval). These quantities are not the same and so the measure selected should be stated explicitly in the graph or supporting text.

Error bars can be used to compare visually two quantities if various other conditions hold. This can determine whether differences are statistically significant. Error bars can also suggest goodness of fit of a given function, i.e., how well the function describes the data. Scientific papers in the experimental sciences are expected to include error bars on all graphs, though the practice differs somewhat between sciences, and each journal will have its own house style. It has also been shown that error bars can be used as a direct manipulation interface for controlling probabilistic algorithms for approximate computation. Error bars can also be expressed in a plus–minus sign (±), plus the upper limit of the error and minus the lower limit of the error.

A notorious misconception in elementary statistics is that error bars show whether a statistically significant difference exists, by checking simply for whether the error bars overlap; this is not the case.

== See also ==
- Box plot
- Information graphics
- Model selection
- Significant figures
