= Kahan summation algorithm =

Algorithm in numerical analysis

In numerical analysis, the Kahan summation algorithm, also known as compensated summation, significantly reduces the numerical error in the total obtained by adding a sequence of finite-precision floating-point numbers, compared to the naive approach (a summation algorithm). This is done by keeping a separate running compensation (a variable to accumulate small errors), in effect extending the precision of the sum by the precision of the compensation variable.

In particular, simply summing $n$ numbers in sequence has a worst-case error that grows proportional to $n$, and a root mean square error that grows as $\sqrt{n}$ for random inputs (the roundoff errors form a random walk). With compensated summation, using a compensation variable with sufficiently high precision the worst-case error bound is effectively independent of $n$, so a large number of values can be summed with an error that only depends on the floating-point precision of the result.

The algorithm is attributed to William Kahan; Ivo Babuška seems to have come up with a similar algorithm independently (hence Kahan–Babuška summation). Similar, earlier techniques are, for example, Bresenham's line algorithm, keeping track of the accumulated error in integer operations (although first documented around the same time) and the delta-sigma modulation.

== The algorithm ==
In pseudocode, the algorithm will be:

function KahanSum(input)
    // Prepare the accumulator.
    var sum = input[1]
    // A running compensation for lost low-order bits.
    var c = 0.0
    // The array input has elements indexed input[1] to input[input.length].
    for i = 2 to input.length do
        // c is zero the first time around.
        var y = input[i] - c
        // Alas, sum is big, y small, so low-order digits of y are lost.         
        var t = sum + y
        // (t - sum) cancels the high-order part of y;
        // subtracting y recovers negative (low part of y)
        c = (t - sum) - y
        // Algebraically, c should always be zero. Beware
        // overly-aggressive optimizing compilers!
        sum = t
    // Next time around, the lost low part will be added to y in a fresh attempt.
    next i

    return sum

This algorithm can also be written in terms of the Fast2Sum algorithm:

function KahanSum2(input)
    var sumHi = input[1], sumLo = 0.0
    for i = 2 to input.length do
        // sumHi + sumLo is an approximation to the exact sum.
        (sumHi,sumLo) = Fast2Sum(sumHi, input[i] + sumLo)
    next i

    return sumHi

While the floating-point operations must not be reordered, this change to the sign of the compensation word (now called sumLo) is safe. The expanded code looks like:

function KahanSum(input)
    var sumHi = input[1], sumLo = 0.0
    for i = 2 to input.length do
        var old_sum = sumHi
        sumLo = sumLo + input[i]
        sumHi = sumHi + sumLo
        sumLo = sumLo + (old_sum - sumHi)
    next i

    return sumHi

=== Worked example ===
The algorithm does not mandate any specific choice of radix, only for the arithmetic to "normalize floating-point sums before rounding or truncating". Computers typically use binary arithmetic, but to make the example easier to read, it will be given in decimal. Suppose we are using six-digit decimal floating-point arithmetic, sum has attained the value 10000.0, and the next two values of input[i] are 3.14159 and 2.71828. The exact result is 10005.85987, which rounds to 10005.9. With a plain summation, each incoming value would be aligned with sum, and many low-order digits would be lost (by truncation or rounding). The first result, after rounding, would be 10003.1. The second result would be 10005.81828 before rounding and 10005.8 after rounding. This is not correct.

However, with compensated summation, we get the correctly rounded result of 10005.9.

Assume that c has the initial value zero. Trailing zeros shown where they are significant for the six-digit floating-point number.

  y = 3.14159 - 0.00000             y = input[i] - c
  t = 10000.0 + 3.14159             t = sum + y
    = 10003.14159                   Normalization done, next round off to six digits.
    = 10003.1                       Few digits from input[i] met those of sum. Many digits have been lost!
  c = (10003.1 - 10000.0) - 3.14159 c = (t - sum) - y  (Note: Parenthesis must be evaluated first!)
    = 3.10000 - 3.14159             The assimilated part of y minus the original full y.
    = -0.0415900                    Because c is close to zero, normalization retains many digits after the floating point. 
sum = 10003.1                       sum = t

The sum is so large that only the high-order digits of the input numbers are being accumulated. But on the next step, c, an approximation of the running error, counteracts the problem.

  y = 2.71828 - (-0.0415900)        Most digits meet, since c is of a size similar to y.
    = 2.75987                       The shortfall (low-order digits lost) of previous iteration successfully reinstated.
  t = 10003.1 + 2.75987             But still only few meet the digits of sum.
    = 10005.85987                   Normalization done, next round to six digits.
    = 10005.9                       Again, many digits have been lost, but c helped nudge the round-off.
  c = (10005.9 - 10003.1) - 2.75987 Estimate the accumulated error, based on the adjusted y.
    = 2.80000 - 2.75987             As expected, the low-order parts can be retained in c with no or minor round-off effects.
    = 0.0401300                     In this iteration, t was a bit too high, the excess will be subtracted off in next iteration.
sum = 10005.9                       Exact result is 10005.85987, sum is correct, rounded to 6 digits.

The algorithm performs summation with two accumulators: sum holds the sum, and c accumulates the parts not assimilated into sum, to nudge the low-order part of sum the next time around. Thus the summation proceeds with "guard digits" in c, which is better than not having any, but is not as good as performing the calculations with double the precision of the input. However, simply increasing the precision of the calculations is not practical in general; if input is already in double precision, few systems supply quadruple precision, and if they did, input could then be in quadruple precision.

== Accuracy ==
A careful analysis of the errors in compensated summation is needed to appreciate its accuracy characteristics. While it is more accurate than naive summation, it can still give large relative errors for ill-conditioned sums.

Suppose that one is summing $n$ values $x_i$, for $i = 1, \, \ldots, \, n$. The exact sum is

$S_n = \sum_{i=1}^n x_i$ (computed with infinite precision).

With compensated summation, one instead obtains $S_n + E_n$, where the error $E_n$ is bounded by

$$|E_n| \le \big[2\varepsilon + O(n\varepsilon^2)\big] \sum_{i=1}^n |x_i|,$$

where $\varepsilon$ is the machine precision of the arithmetic being employed (e.g. $\varepsilon \approx 10^{-16}$ for IEEE standard double-precision floating point). Usually, the quantity of interest is the relative error $|E_n|/|S_n|$, which is therefore bounded above by

$$\frac{|E_n|}{|S_n|} \le \big[2\varepsilon + O(n\varepsilon^2)\big] \frac{\sum\limits_{i=1}^n |x_i|}{\left|\sum\limits_{i=1}^n x_i\right|}.$$

In the expression for the relative error bound, the fraction $\Sigma |x_i| / |\Sigma x_i|$ is the condition number of the summation problem. Essentially, the condition number represents the intrinsic sensitivity of the summation problem to errors, regardless of how it is computed. The relative error bound of every (backwards stable) summation method by a fixed algorithm in fixed precision (i.e. not those that use arbitrary-precision arithmetic, nor algorithms whose memory and time requirements change based on the data), is proportional to this condition number. An ill-conditioned summation problem is one in which this ratio is large, and in this case even compensated summation can have a large relative error. For example, if the summands $x_i$ are uncorrelated random numbers with zero mean, the sum is a random walk, and the condition number will grow proportional to $\sqrt{n}$. On the other hand, for random inputs with nonzero mean the condition number asymptotes to a finite constant as $n \to \infty$. If the inputs are all non-negative, then the condition number is 1.

Given a condition number, the relative error of compensated summation is effectively independent of $n$. In principle, there is the $O (n \varepsilon^2)$ that grows linearly with $n$, but in practice this term is effectively zero: since the final result is rounded to a precision $\varepsilon$, the $n \varepsilon^2$ term rounds to zero, unless $n$ is roughly $1 / \varepsilon$ or larger. In double precision, this corresponds to an $n$ of roughly $10^{16}$, much larger than most sums. So, for a fixed condition number, the errors of compensated summation are effectively $O (\varepsilon)$, independent of $n$.

In comparison, the relative error bound for naive summation (simply adding the numbers in sequence, rounding at each step) grows as $O(\varepsilon n)$ multiplied by the condition number. This worst-case error is rarely observed in practice, however, because it only occurs if the rounding errors are all in the same direction. In practice, it is much more likely that the rounding errors have a random sign, with zero mean, so that they form a random walk; in this case, naive summation has a root mean square relative error that grows as $O\left(\varepsilon \sqrt{n}\right)$ multiplied by the condition number. This is still much worse than compensated summation, however. However, if the sum can be performed in twice the precision, then $\varepsilon$ is replaced by $\varepsilon^2$, and naive summation has a worst-case error comparable to the $O(n \varepsilon^2)$ term in compensated summation at the original precision.

By the same token, the $\Sigma |x_i|$ that appears in $E_n$ above is a worst-case bound that occurs only if all the rounding errors have the same sign (and are of maximal possible magnitude). In practice, it is more likely that the errors have random sign, in which case terms in $\Sigma |x_i|$ are replaced by a random walk, in which case, even for random inputs with zero mean, the error $E_n$ grows only as $O\left(\varepsilon \sqrt{n}\right)$ (ignoring the $n \varepsilon^2$ term), the same rate the sum $S_n$ grows, canceling the $\sqrt{n}$ factors when the relative error is computed. So, even for asymptotically ill-conditioned sums, the relative error for compensated summation can often be much smaller than a worst-case analysis might suggest.

== Further enhancements ==
=== Precision ===
Neumaier introduced an improved version of Kahan algorithm, which he calls an "improved Kahan–Babuška algorithm", which also covers the case when the next term to be added is larger in absolute value than the running sum, effectively swapping the role of what is large and what is small. In pseudocode, the algorithm is:

function KahanBabushkaNeumaierSum(input)
    var sum = 0.0
    var c = 0.0                       // A running compensation for lost low-order bits.

    for i = 1 to input.length do
        var t = sum + input[i]
        if |sum| >= |input[i]| then
            c += (sum - t) + input[i] // If sum is bigger, low-order digits of input[i] are lost.
        else
            c += (input[i] - t) + sum // Else low-order digits of sum are lost.
        endif
        sum = t
    next i

    return sum + c                    // Correction only applied once in the very end.

This enhancement is similar to the Fast2Sum version of Kahan's algorithm with Fast2Sum replaced by 2Sum, i.e.

function KahanBabushkaNeumaierSum2(input)
    var sum = 0.0
    var c = 0.0
    for i = 1 to input.length do
        var y = input[i] + c
        (sum,c) = 2Sum(sum,y)
    next i

    return sum

For many sequences of numbers, both algorithms agree, but a simple example due to Peters shows how they can differ: summing $[1.0, +10^{100}, 1.0, -10^{100}]$ in double precision, Kahan's algorithm yields 0.0, whereas Neumaier's algorithm yields the correct value 2.0.

Higher-order modifications of better accuracy are also possible. For example, a variant suggested by Klein, which he called a second-order "iterative Kahan–Babuška algorithm". In pseudocode, the algorithm is:

function KahanBabushkaKleinSum(input)
    var sum = 0.0
    var cs  = 0.0
    var ccs = 0.0

    for i = 1 to input.length do
        var c, cc
        var t = sum + input[i]
        if |sum| >= |input[i]| then
            c = (sum - t) + input[i]
        else
            c = (input[i] - t) + sum
        endif
        sum = t
        t = cs + c
        if |cs| >= |c| then
            cc = (cs - t) + c
        else
            cc = (c - t) + cs
        endif
        cs = t
        ccs = ccs + cc
    end loop 

    return sum + (cs + ccs)

=== Speed ===
In the Kahan summation algorithm, each iteration of the loop depends on the result of a previous iteration (loop-carried data dependency). This reduces the performance gain from modern superscalar processor designs. To reduce this penalty, one can split the accumulator variables s and c into several copies each working on a portion of the input. These copies can be accumulated in parallel using a superscalar CPU, SIMD, or even multiprocessing. The separate copies are finally accumulated together using the scalar (non-parallel) Kahan algorithm.

== Alternatives ==
Although Kahan's algorithm achieves $O(1)$ error growth for summing n numbers, only slightly worse $O(\log n)$ growth can be achieved by pairwise summation: one recursively divides the set of numbers into two halves, sums each half, and then adds the two sums. This has the advantage of requiring the same number of arithmetic operations as the naive summation (unlike Kahan's algorithm, which requires four times the arithmetic and has a latency of four times a simple summation) and can be calculated in parallel. The base case of the recursion could in principle be the sum of only one (or zero) numbers, but to amortize the overhead of recursion, one would normally use a larger base case. In practice, with roundoff errors of random signs, the root mean square errors of pairwise summation actually grow as $O\left(\sqrt{\log n}\right)$. Pairwise summation is used by NumPy and Julia, among other notable numeric packages.

Another alternative is to calculate the even more precise correctly rounded sum. This could be done naively in arbitrary-precision arithmetic, which in principle, with no intermediate rounding at all with a cost of much greater computational effort. A more efficient way is to extend adaptively using multiple floating-point components (Shewchuk's). This will minimize computational cost in common cases where high precision is not needed. This style of summation is used by Python's math.fsum function.

== Possible invalidation by compiler optimization ==
In principle, a sufficiently aggressive optimizing compiler could destroy the effectiveness of Kahan summation: for example, if the compiler simplified expressions according to the associativity rules of real arithmetic, it might "simplify" the second step in the sequence

t = sum + y;
c = (t - sum) - y;

to

c = ((sum + y) - sum) - y;

and then to

c = 0;

thus eliminating the error compensation. In practice, many compilers do not use associativity rules (which are only approximate in floating-point arithmetic) in simplifications, unless explicitly directed to do so by compiler options enabling "unsafe" optimizations, although the Intel C++ Compiler is one example that allows associativity-based transformations by default. The original K&R C version of the C programming language allowed the compiler to re-order floating-point expressions according to real-arithmetic associativity rules, but the subsequent ANSI C standard prohibited re-ordering in order to make C better suited for numerical applications (and more similar to Fortran, which also prohibits re-ordering), although in practice compiler options can re-enable re-ordering, as mentioned above.

A portable way to inhibit such optimizations locally is to break one of the lines in the original formulation into two statements, and make two of the intermediate products volatile:

function KahanSum(input)
    var sum = 0.0
    var c = 0.0

    for i = 1 to input.length do
        var y = input[i] - c
        volatile var t = sum + y
        volatile var z = t - sum
        c = z - y
        sum = t
    next i

    return sum

== Support by libraries ==
In general, built-in "sum" functions in computer languages typically provide no guarantees that a particular summation algorithm will be employed, much less Kahan summation. The BLAS standard for linear algebra subroutines explicitly avoids mandating any particular computational order of operations for performance reasons, and BLAS implementations typically do not use Kahan summation.

The standard library of the Python computer language uses the Neumaier summation in the builtin "sum()" function starting with CPython 3.12. NumPy makes no guarantee for the order of summation, though partial pairwise summation is "often" used.

In the Julia language, the default implementation of the sum function does pairwise summation for high accuracy with good performance, but an external library provides an implementation of Neumaier's variant named sum_kbn for the cases when higher accuracy is needed.

In the C# language, HPCsharp nuget package implements the Neumaier variant and pairwise summation: both as scalar, data-parallel using SIMD processor instructions, and parallel multi-core.

== See also ==
- Algorithms for calculating variance, which includes stable summation
