= Ramon E. Moore =

American mathematician

Ramon Edgar (Ray) Moore (December 27, 1929 – April 1, 2015) was an American mathematician, known for his pioneering work in the field of interval arithmetic.

Moore received an AB degree in physics from the University of California, Berkeley in 1950, and a PhD in mathematics from Stanford University in 1963. His early career included work on the earliest computers (including ENIAC). He was awarded the Humboldt Research Award for U.S. senior scientists twice, in 1975 and 1980.

His most well known work is his first book, Interval Analysis, published in 1966. He wrote several more books and many journal articles and technical reports.

== R. E. Moore Prize ==
The R. E. Moore Prize for Applications of Interval Analysis is an award in the interdisciplinary field of rigorous numerics. It is awarded biennially by the Computer Science Department at the University of Texas at El Paso, and judged by the editorial board of the journal Reliable Computing. The award was named in honor of Moore's contributions to interval analysis.

=== Laureates ===
Year	Name	Citation
2002	Warwick Tucker	Dr. Tucker has proved, using interval techniques, that the renowned Lorenz equations do in fact possess a strange attractor. This problem, Smale's 14th conjecture, is of particular note in large part because the Lorenz model is widely recognized as signaling the beginning of chaos theory
2004	Thomas C. Hales	Dr. Hales solved this long-standing problem by using interval arithmetic. His preliminary results appeared in the Notices of the American Math Society in 2000; his full paper "The Kepler Conjecture" will appear in Annals of Mathematics, one of the world leading journals in pure mathematics.
2006	not awarded	
2008	Kyoko Makino and Martin Berz	For their paper "Suppression of the Wrapping Effect by Taylor Model-based Verified Integrators: Long-term Stabilization by Preconditioning" published in International Journal of Differential Equations and Applications in 2005 (Vol. 10, No. 4, pp. 353–384).
2012	Luc Jaulin	For his paper "A nonlinear set-membership approach for the localization and map building of an underwater robot using interval constraint propagation" published in IEEE Transactions on Robotics in 2009 (Vol. 25, No. 1, pp. 88–98).
2014	Kenta Kobayashi	For his paper "Computer-Assisted Uniqueness Proof for Stokes' Wave of Extreme Form" published in Nankai Series in Pure, Applied Mathematics and Theoretical Physics in 2013 (Vol. 10, pp. 54–67).
2016	Balazs Banhelyi, Tibor Csendes, Tibor Krisztin, and Arnold Neumaier	For their paper "Global attractivity of the zero solution for Wright's equation" published in SIAM Journal on Applied Dynamical Systems in 2014 (Vol. 13, No. 1, pp. 537–563).
2018	Jordi-Lluís Figueras, Alex Haro and Alejandro Luque	For their paper "Rigorous Computer-Assisted Application of KAM Theory: A Modern Approach", published in Foundations of Computational Mathematics in 2017 (Vol. 17, No. 5, pp. 1123–1193).
2021	Marko Lange and Siegfried M. Rump	For their paper "Verified inclusions for a nearest matrix of specified rank deficiency via a generalization of Wedin's sin (θ) theorem" published in BIT Numerical Mathematics in 2021 (Vol. 61, pp. 361-380).
2025	Tristan Buckmaster, Gonzalo Cao-Labora and Javier Gómez-Serrano	For their paper "Smooth imploding solutions for 3D compressible fluids" published in Forum of Mathematics Pi in 2025 (Vol. 13, paper).

== See also ==
- List of mathematics awards
