= SIAM Journal on Scientific Computing =

- Discipline: Scientific computation
- Language: English
- Edited by: Hans De Sterck

Publication details
- Former names: SIAM Journal on Scientific & Statistical Computing
- History: 1980 to present
- Publisher: Society for Industrial and Applied Mathematics
- Frequency: Bimonthly
- Open access: no

Standard abbreviations
- ISO 4: SIAM J. Sci. Comput.

Indexing
- CODEN: SJOCE3
- ISSN: 1064-8275 (print); 1095-7197 (web)

Links
- Journal homepage; Online access

The SIAM Journal on Scientific Computing (SISC), formerly SIAM Journal on Scientific & Statistical Computing, is a scientific journal focusing on the research articles on numerical methods and techniques for scientific computation. It is published by the Society for Industrial and Applied Mathematics (SIAM). Hans De Sterck is the current editor-in-chief, assuming the role in January 2022. The impact factor is currently around 2.

This journal papers address computational issues relevant to solution of scientific or engineering problems and include computational results demonstrating the effectiveness of proposed techniques. They are classified into three categories: 1) Methods and Algorithms for Scientific Computing. 2) Computational Methods in Science and Engineering. 3) Software and High-Performance Computing. The first type papers focus on theoretical analysis, provided that relevance to applications in science and engineering is demonstrated. They are supposed to contain meaningful computational results and theoretical results or strong heuristics supporting the performance of new algorithms. The second type papers pay much attention to describing novel methodologies for solving a specific problem in computational science or engineering. The information about the application to orient other computational scientists is necessary. The third type papers more concern about novel design and development of computational methods and high-quality software, parallel algorithms, high-performance computing issues, new architectures, data analysis or visualization. However, the primary focus should be on computational methods that have huge impact on scientific or engineering problems.

The modern numerical analysis can be dated back to 1947 when John von Neumann and Herman Goldstine wrote a pioneering paper, “Numerical Inverting of Matrices of High Order” (Bulletin of the AMS, Nov. 1947). This paper commonly is considered one of the first papers to study rounding error and include discussion of what is called scientific computing nowadays. Although, from math history, numerical analysis has a longer and richer history, “modern” numerical analysis is defined by the mix of the programmable electronic computer, mathematical analysis, and the opportunity and need to solve large and complex problems in life applications. The need, such as, ballistics prediction, neutron transport, and nonsteady, multidimensional fluid dynamics pushed the development of computer and depended strongly on developments in numerical analysis and mathematical modeling.
