= Karlsruhe Accurate Arithmetic =

Mathematical software library

Karlsruhe Accurate Arithmetic (KAA), or Karlsruhe Accurate Arithmetic Approach (KAAA), augments conventional floating-point arithmetic with good error behaviour with new operations to calculate scalar products with a single rounding error.

The foundations for KAA were developed at the University of Karlsruhe starting in the late 1960s.

== See also ==
- Ulrich W. Kulisch
- Götz Alefeld
