= John Gustafson (scientist) =

American computer scientist and businessman

John Leroy Gustafson
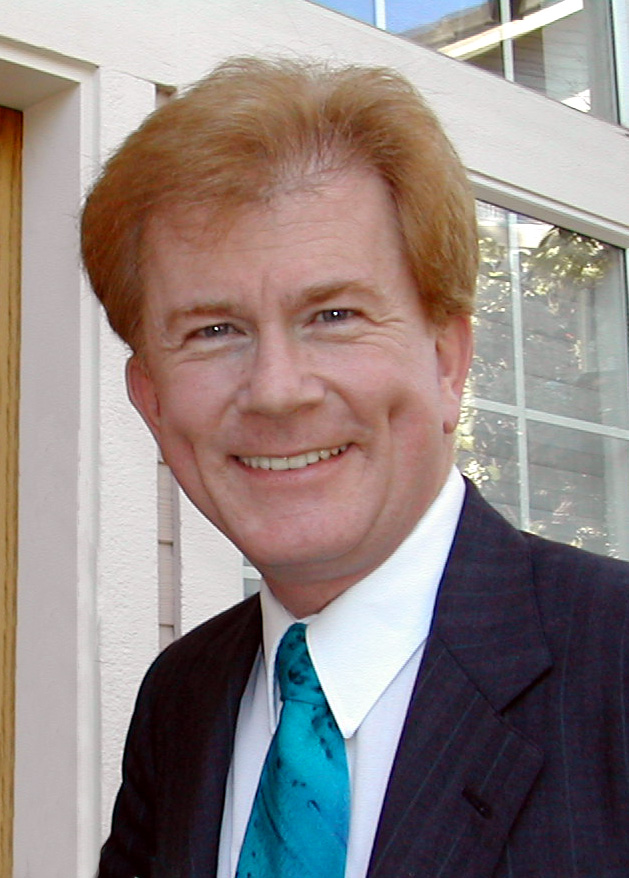
- Born: January 19, 1955 (age 71); United States
- Education: California Institute of Technology; Iowa State University
- Known for: Gustafson's law; Unum
- Awards: Gordon Bell Prize; International Atanasoff Award
- Scientific career
- Thesis: Asymptotic Expansions of Elliptic Integrals (1982)
- Doctoral advisor: Bille C. Carlson
- Website: johngustafson.net

John Leroy Gustafson (born January 19, 1955) is an American computer scientist and businessman, chiefly known for his work in high-performance computing (HPC) such as the invention of Gustafson's law, introducing the first commercial computer cluster, measuring with QUIPS, leading the reconstruction of the Atanasoff–Berry computer, inventing the unum number format and computation system, and several awards for computer speedup. Currently he is the Chief Technology Officer at Ceranovo, Inc. He was the Chief Graphics Product Architect and Senior Fellow at AMD from September 2012 until June 2013, and he previously held the positions of Architect of Intel Labs-SC, CEO of Massively Parallel Technologies, Inc. and CTO at ClearSpeed Technology. Gustafson holds applied mathematics degrees from the California Institute of Technology and Iowa State University.

== Childhood and education ==
Gustafson was raised in Des Moines, Iowa. After completing a degree in Applied Mathematics at California Institute of Technology in 1977 he moved to Ames, Iowa and completed his M.S. (1981) and Ph.D. (1982) at Iowa State University.

His mother was an electronics technician at Collins Radio and his father was a chemical engineer turned MD, both as a result of World War II. His parents encouraged his scientific explorations at a young age. Assembling radio transmitters, designing and executing chemistry experiments, and making holograms are some of his favorite childhood explorations.

== Unums ==
Gustafson has devised a new format for storing real numbers in computers use a variable number of bits depending on the number of digits required, called unum number format. Normal formats store numbers as a fixed number of bits, for example 64 bits is usual for double-precision floating-point format numbers. This can allow them to be smaller than doubles for fast processing and also more precise or larger than the limits for double when desirable.

== Awards and honors ==
In 1988, Gustafson was the recipient of the inaugural Gordon Bell Prize. He has received other awards for his work in HPC, including the International Atanasoff Award (2006). He was awarded the IEEE Computer Society Golden Core Award in 2007.

Other awards and honors include:

- 2000 Iowa State University Inventor of the Year Award
- 1998 Distinguished Visiting Professor, New Mexico State University
- 1997 PDPTA Outstanding Achievement Award
- 1995 R&D 100 Award
- 1991 R&D 100 Award
- 1990 New Mexico Inventor of the Year Award
- 1989 R&D 100 Award
- 1977 Richter Fellowship
- 1974 Eric Temple Bell Award
- 1973 Drake Physics Prize
