= Maximum satisfiability problem =

Problem in computational complexity theory

In computational complexity theory, the maximum satisfiability problem (MAX-SAT) is the problem of determining the maximum number of clauses, of a given Boolean formula in conjunctive normal form, that can be made true by an assignment of truth values to the variables of the formula. It is a generalization of the Boolean satisfiability problem, which asks whether there exists a truth assignment that makes all clauses true.

== Example ==
The conjunctive normal form formula

$$(x_0\lor x_1)\land(x_0\lor\lnot x_1)\land(\lnot x_0\lor x_1)\land(\lnot x_0\lor\lnot x_1)$$

is not satisfiable: no matter which truth values are assigned to its two variables, at least one of its four clauses will be false. However, it is possible to assign truth values in such a way as to make three out of four clauses true; indeed, every truth assignment will do this. Therefore, if this formula is given as an instance of the MAX-SAT problem, the solution to the problem is the number three.

== Hardness ==
The MAX-SAT problem is OptP-complete, and thus NP-hard (as a decision problem), since its solution easily leads to the solution of the boolean satisfiability problem, which is NP-complete.

It is also difficult to find an approximate solution of the problem, that satisfies a number of clauses within a guaranteed approximation ratio of the optimal solution. More precisely, the problem is APX-complete, and thus does not admit a polynomial-time approximation scheme unless P = NP.

== Weighted MAX-SAT ==
More generally, one can define a weighted version of MAX-SAT as follows: given a conjunctive normal form formula with non-negative weights assigned to each clause, find truth values for its variables that maximize the combined weight of the satisfied clauses. The MAX-SAT problem is an instance of Weighted MAX-SAT where all weights are 1.

=== Approximation algorithms ===
==== 1/2-approximation ====
Randomly assigning each variable to be true with probability 1/2 gives an expected 2-approximation. More precisely, if each clause has at least k variables, then this yields a (1 − 2^{−k})-approximation. This algorithm can be derandomized using the method of conditional probabilities.

==== (1-1/e)-approximation ====
MAX-SAT can also be expressed using an integer linear program (ILP). Fix a conjunctive normal form formula F with variables x_{1}, x_{2}, ..., x_{n}, and let C denote the clauses of F. For each clause c in C, let S^{+}_{c} and S^{−}_{c} denote the sets of variables which are not negated in c, and those that are negated in c, respectively. The variables y_{x} of the ILP will correspond to the variables of the formula F, whereas the variables z_{c} will correspond to the clauses. The ILP is as follows:

maximize	$\sum_{c \in C} w_c\cdot z_c$		(maximize the weight of the satisfied clauses)
subject to	$z_c\leq\sum_{x\in S_c^+} y_x+\sum_{x\in S_c^-} (1-y_x)$	for all $c\in C$	(clause is true iff it has a true, non-negated variable or a false, negated one)
	$z_c \in \{0,1\}$	for all $c\in C$.	(every clause is either satisfied or not)
	$y_x \in \{0,1\}$	for all $x\in F$.	(every variable is either true or false)

The above program can be relaxed to the following linear program L:

maximize	$\sum_{c \in C} w_c\cdot z_c$		(maximize the weight of the satisfied clauses)
subject to	$z_c\leq\sum_{x\in S_c^+} y_x+\sum_{x\in S_c^-} (1-y_x)$	for all $c\in C$	(clause is true iff it has a true, non-negated variable or a false, negated one)
	$0\leq z_c \leq 1$	for all $c\in C$.
	$0\leq y_x\leq 1$	for all $x\in F$.

The following algorithm using that relaxation is an expected (1-1/e)-approximation:

1. Solve the linear program L and obtain a solution O
2. Set variable x to be true with probability y_{x} where y_{x} is the value given in O.

This algorithm can also be derandomized using the method of conditional probabilities.

==== 3/4-approximation ====
The 1/2-approximation algorithm does better when clauses are large whereas the (1-1/e)-approximation does better when clauses are small. They can be combined as follows:

1. Run the (derandomized) 1/2-approximation algorithm to get a truth assignment X.
2. Run the (derandomized) (1-1/e)-approximation to get a truth assignment Y.
3. Output whichever of X or Y maximizes the weight of the satisfied clauses.

This is a deterministic factor (3/4)-approximation.

===== Example =====
On the formula

$$F=\underbrace{(x\lor y)}_{\text{weight }1}\land \underbrace{(x\lor\lnot y)}_{\text{weight }1}\land\underbrace{(\lnot x\lor z)}_{\text{weight }2+\epsilon}$$

where $\epsilon >0$, the (1-1/e)-approximation will set each variable to True with probability 1/2, and so will behave identically to the 1/2-approximation. Assuming that the assignment of x is chosen first during derandomization, the derandomized algorithms will pick a solution with total weight $3+\epsilon$, whereas the optimal solution has weight $4+\epsilon$.

==== State of the art ====
The state-of-the-art algorithm is due to Avidor, Berkovitch and Zwick, and its approximation ratio is 0.7968. They also give another algorithm whose approximation ratio is conjectured to be 0.8353.

== Solvers ==
Many exact solvers for MAX-SAT have been developed during recent years, and many of them were presented in the well-known conference on the boolean satisfiability problem and related problems, the SAT Conference. In 2006 the SAT Conference hosted the first MAX-SAT evaluation comparing performance of practical solvers for MAX-SAT, as it has done in the past for the pseudo-boolean satisfiability problem and the quantified boolean formula problem. Because of its NP-hardness, large-size MAX-SAT instances cannot in general be solved exactly, and one must often resort to approximation algorithms and heuristics

There are several solvers submitted to the last Max-SAT Evaluations:

- Branch and Bound based: Clone, MaxSatz (based on Satz), IncMaxSatz, IUT_MaxSatz, WBO, GIDSHSat.
- Satisfiability based: SAT4J, QMaxSat.
- Unsatisfiability based: msuncore, WPM1, PM2.

== Special cases ==
MAX-SAT is one of the optimization extensions of the boolean satisfiability problem, which is the problem of determining whether the variables of a given Boolean formula can be assigned in such a way as to make the formula evaluate to TRUE. If the clauses are restricted to have at most 2 literals, as in 2-satisfiability, we get the MAX-2SAT problem. If they are restricted to at most 3 literals per clause, as in 3-satisfiability, we get the MAX-3SAT problem.

== Related problems ==
There are many problems related to the satisfiability of conjunctive normal form Boolean formulas.

- Decision problems:
  - 2SAT
  - 3SAT
- Optimization problems, where the goal is to maximize the number of clauses satisfied:
  - MAX-SAT, and the corresponded weighted version Weighted MAX-SAT
  - MAX-kSAT, where each clause has exactly k variables:
    - MAX-2SAT
    - MAX-3SAT
    - MAXEkSAT
  - The partial maximum satisfiability problem (PMAX-SAT) asks for the maximum number of clauses which can be satisfied by any assignment of a given subset of clauses. The rest of the clauses must be satisfied.
  - The soft satisfiability problem (soft-SAT), given a set of SAT problems, asks for the maximum number of those problems which can be satisfied by any assignment.
  - The minimum satisfiability problem.
- The MAX-SAT problem can be extended to the case where the variables of the constraint satisfaction problem belong to the set of reals. The problem amounts to finding the smallest q such that the q-relaxed intersection of the constraints is not empty.

== See also ==
- Boolean Satisfiability Problem
- Constraint satisfaction
- Satisfiability modulo theories
