= Relaxed intersection =

The relaxed intersection of m sets corresponds to the classical intersection between sets except that it is allowed to relax few sets in order to avoid an empty intersection. This notion can be used to solve constraints satisfaction problems that are inconsistent by relaxing a small number of constraints. When a bounded-error approach is considered for parameter estimation, the relaxed intersection makes it possible to be robust with respect to some outliers.

== Definition ==
The q-relaxed intersection of the m subsets $X_{1},\dots ,X_{m}$ of $R^{n}$, denoted by $X^{\{q\}}=\bigcap^{\{q\}}X_{i}$ is the set of all $x \in R^{n}$ which belong to all $X_{i}$ 's, except $q$ at most. This definition is illustrated by Figure 1.

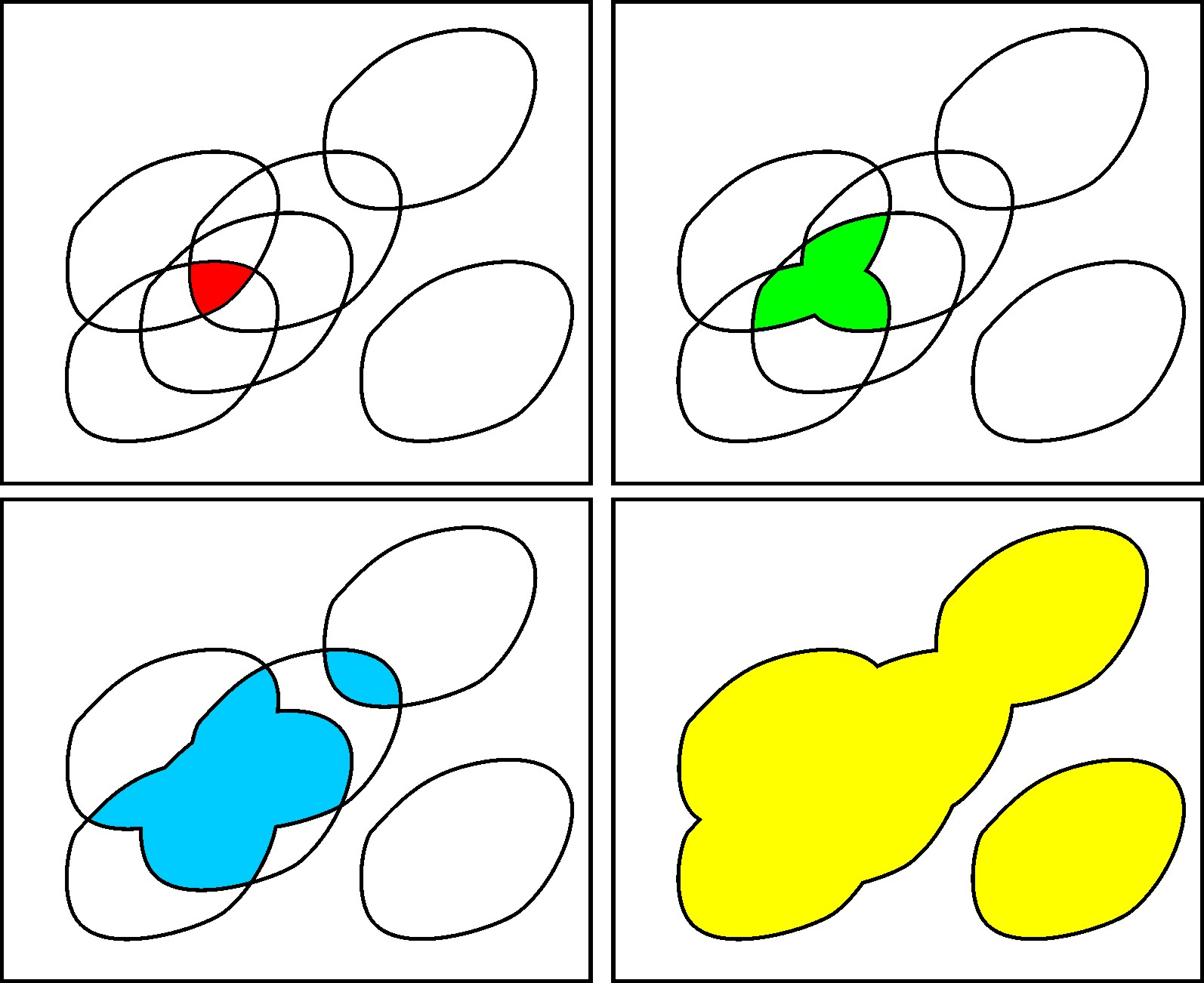
Figure 1. q-intersection of 6 sets for q=2 (red), q=3 (green), q= 4 (blue), q= 5 (yellow).

Define $\lambda (x) =\text{card} \left\{ i\ |\ x\in X_{i}\right\}.$

We have $X^{\{q\}}=\lambda ^{-1}([m-q,m]) .$

Characterizing the q-relaxed intersection is a thus a set inversion problem.

== Example ==
Consider 8 intervals: $X_{1}=[1,4],$ $X_{2}=\ [2,4],$ $X_{3}=[2,7],$ $X_{4}=[6,9],$ $X_{5}=[3,4],$ $X_{6}=[3,7].$

We have

$X^{\{0\}} = \emptyset,$ $X^{\{1\}}=[3,4],$ $X^{\{2\}}=[3,4],$ $X^{\{3\}}=[2,4] \cup [6,7],$ $X^{\{4\}}=[2,7],$ $X^{\{5\}}=[1,9],$ $X^{\{6\}}=]-\infty ,\infty [.$

== Relaxed intersection of intervals ==
The relaxed intersection of intervals is not necessary an interval. We thus take the interval hull of the result. If $X_i$'s are intervals, the relaxed intersection can be computed with a complexity of m.log(m) by using the Marzullo's algorithm. It suffices to sort all lower and upper bounds of the m intervals to represent the function $\lambda$. Then, we easily get the set

$X^{\{q\}}=\lambda^{-1}([m-q,m])$

which corresponds to a union of intervals. We then return the smallest interval which contains this union.

Figure 2 shows the function $\lambda(x)$ associated to the previous example.

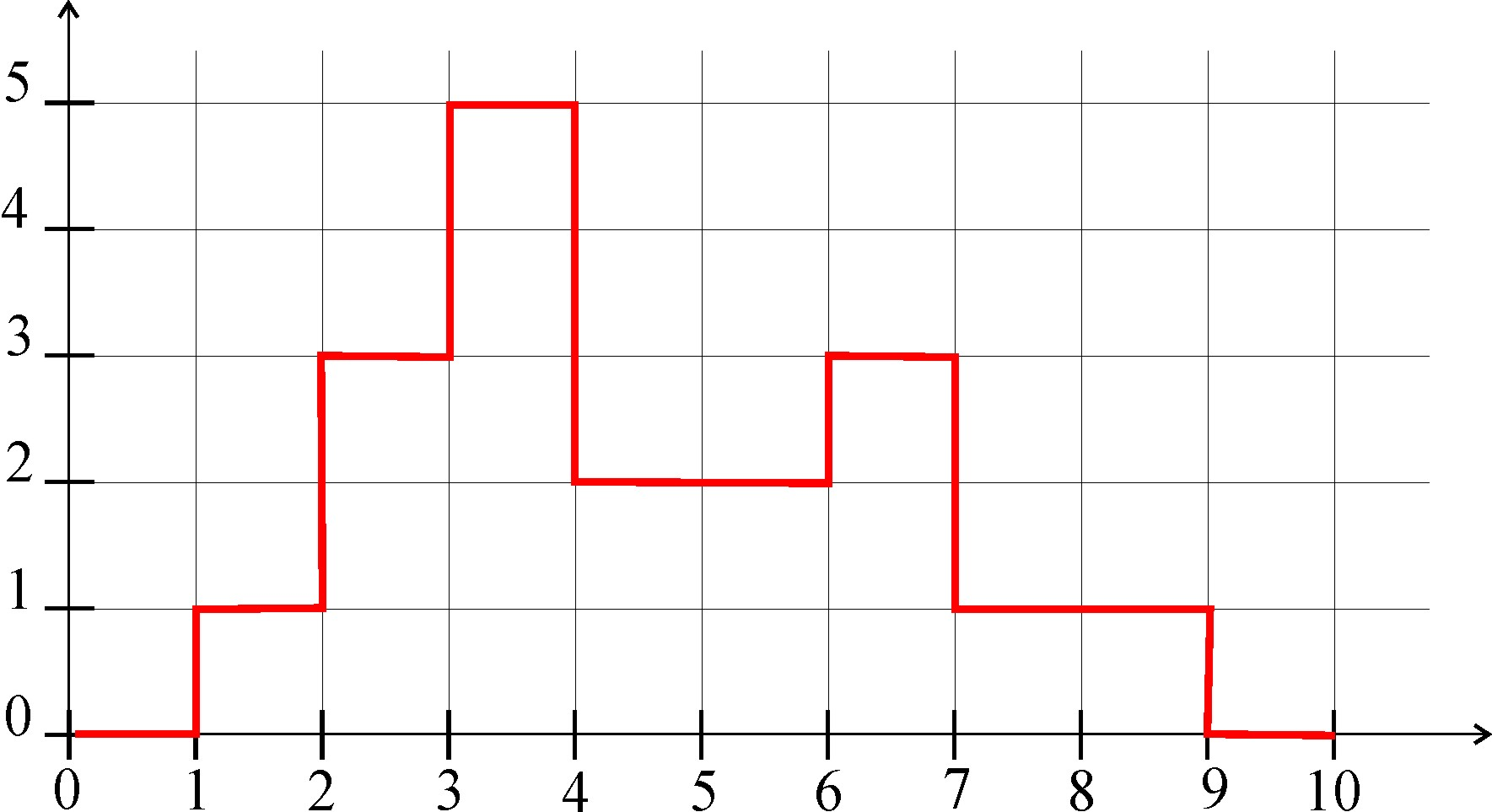
Figure 2. Set-membership function associated to the 6 intervals.

== Relaxed intersection of boxes ==
To compute the q-relaxed intersection of m boxes of $R^{n}$, we project all m boxes with respect to the n axes. For each of the n groups of m intervals, we compute the q-relaxed intersection. We return Cartesian product of the n resulting intervals. Figure 3 provides an illustration of the 4-relaxed intersection of 6 boxes. Each point of the red box belongs to 4 of the 6 boxes.

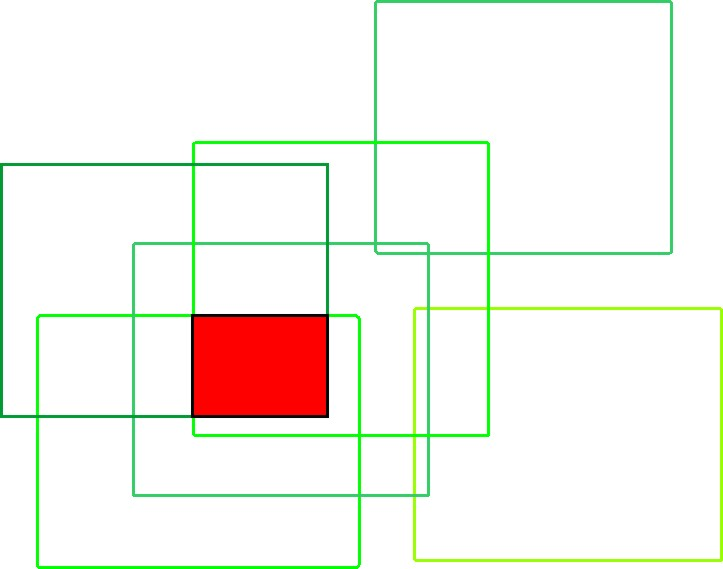
Figure 3. The red box corresponds to the 4-relaxed intersection of the 6 boxes

== Relaxed union ==
The q-relaxed union of $X_1,\dots ,X_m$ is defined by

$\overset{\{q\}}{\bigcup}X_{i}=\bigcap^{\{m-1-q\}}X_i$

Note that when q=0, the relaxed union/intersection corresponds to the classical union/intersection. More precisely, we have

$\bigcap^{\{0\}}X_{i} =\bigcap X_i$

and

$\overset{\{0\} }{\bigcup}X_{i} =\bigcup X_i$

== De Morgan's law ==
If $\overline{X}$ denotes the complementary set of $X_i$, we have

$\overline{\bigcap^{\{q\}}X_i} = \overset{\{q\}}{\bigcup}\overline{X_i}$

$\overline{\overset{\{q\} }{\bigcup }X_i}=\bigcap^{\{q\}}\overline{X_i}.$

As a consequence

$\overline{\bigcap\limits^{\{q\}}X_i}=\overline{\overset{\{m-q-1\} }{\bigcup }X_i}=\bigcap^{\{m-q-1\}}\overline{X_i}$

== Relaxation of contractors ==
Let $C_1,\dots ,C_m$ be m contractors for the sets $X_1,\dots ,X_m$, then

$C([x]) =\bigcap^{\{q\}}C_i([x]).$

is a contractor for $X^{\{q\}}$ and

$\overline{C}([x]) =\bigcap^{\{m-q-1\}}\overline{C}_i([x])$

is a contractor for $\overline{X}^{\{q\}}$, where

$\overline{C}_1,\dots,\overline{C}_{m}$

are contractors for

$\overline{X}_1,\dots ,\overline{X}_m.$

Combined with a branch-and-bound algorithm such as SIVIA (Set Inversion Via Interval Analysis), the q-relaxed intersection of m subsets of $R^{n}$ can be computed.

== Application to bounded-error estimation ==
The q-relaxed intersection can be used for robust localization or for tracking.

Robust observers can also be implemented using the relaxed intersections to be robust with respect to outliers.

We propose here a simple example to illustrate the method. Consider a model the ith model output of which is given by

$f_i(p)=\frac{1}{\sqrt{2\pi p_2}}\exp (-\frac{(t_i-p_1)^{2}}{2p_2})$

where $p\in R^{2}$. Assume that we have

$f_i(p) \in [y_i]$

where $t_i$ and $[y_i]$ are given by the following list

$\{ (1,[0;0.2]),(2,[0.3;2]),(3,[0.3;2]),(4,[0.1;0.2]),(5,[0.4;2]),(6,[-1;0.1]) \}$

The sets $\lambda^{-1}(q)$ for different $q$ are depicted on Figure 4.

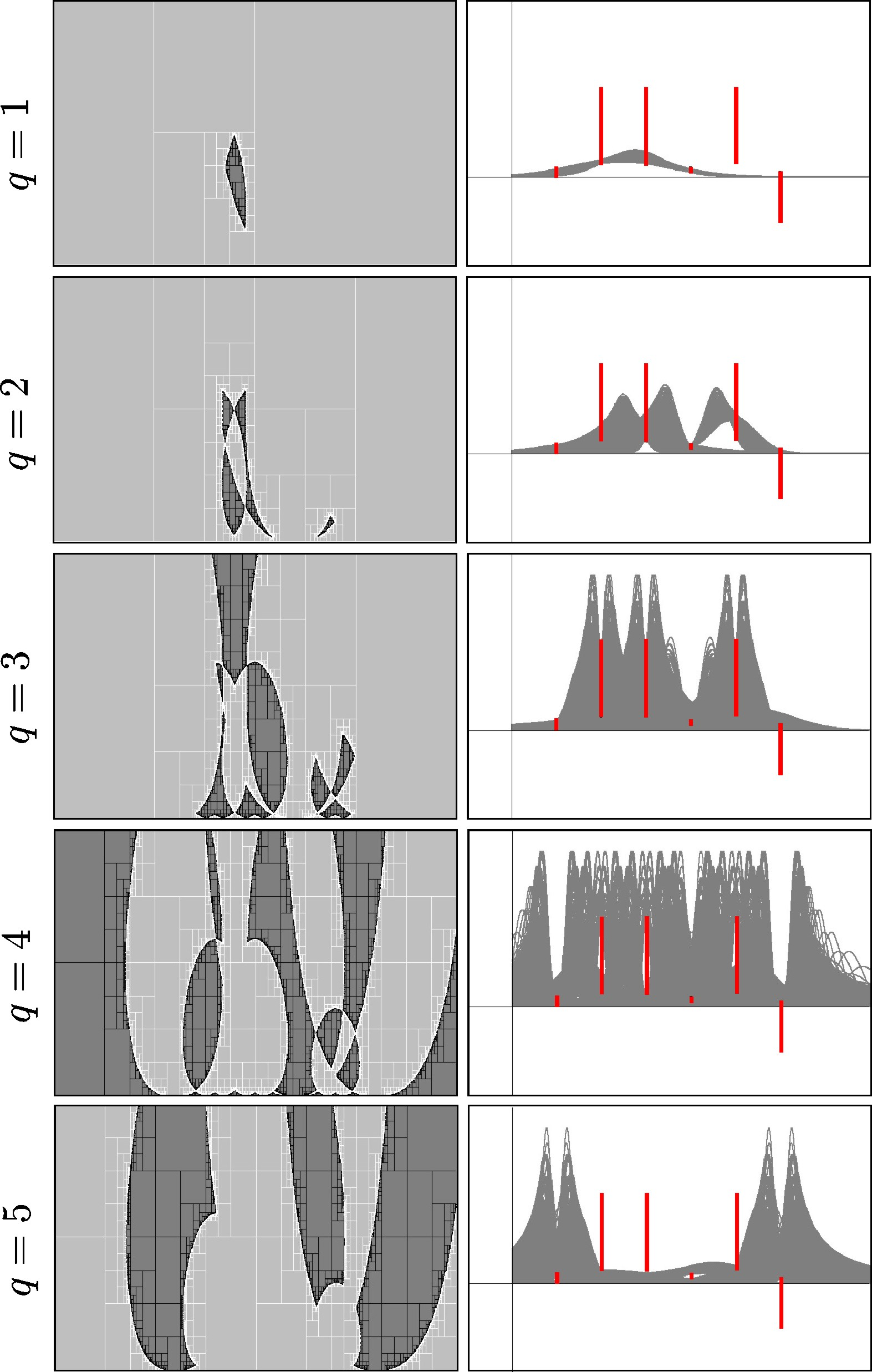
Figure 4. Set of all parameter vectors consistent with exactly 6-q data bars (painted red), for q=1,2,3,4,5.
