= Interval propagation =

In numerical mathematics, interval propagation or interval constraint propagation is the problem of contracting interval domains associated to variables of R without removing any value that is consistent with a set of constraints (i.e., equations or inequalities). It can be used to propagate uncertainties in the situation where errors are represented by intervals. Interval propagation considers an estimation problem as a constraint satisfaction problem.

== Atomic contractors ==
A contractor associated to an equation involving the variables x_{1},...,x_{n} is an operator which contracts the intervals [x_{1}],..., [x_{n}] (that are supposed to enclose the x_{i}'s) without removing any value for the variables that is consistent with the equation.

A contractor is said to be atomic if it is not built as a composition of other contractors. The main theory that is used to build atomic contractors are based on interval analysis.

Example. Consider for instance the equation

$$x_1+x_2 =x_3,$$

which involves the three variables x_{1},x_{2} and x_{3}.

The associated contractor is given by the following statements

$$[x_3]:=[x_3] \cap ([x_1]+[x_2])$$

$$[x_1]:=[x_1] \cap ( [x_3]-[x_2])$$

$$[x_2]:=[x_2] \cap ( [x_3]-[x_1])$$

For instance, if

$$x_1 \in [-\infty ,5],$$

$$x_2 \in [-\infty ,4],$$

$$x_3 \in [ 6,\infty]$$

the contractor performs the following calculus

$$x_3=x_1+x_2 \Rightarrow  x_3 \in [6,\infty ] \cap ([-\infty,5]+[-\infty ,4]) =[6,\infty ] \cap [-\infty ,9]=[6,9].$$

$$x_1=x_3-x_2 \Rightarrow  x_1 \in [-\infty ,5]\cap ([6,\infty]-[-\infty ,4])  =[-\infty ,5] \cap [2,\infty ]=[2,5].$$

$$x_2=x_3-x_1 \Rightarrow  x_2 \in [-\infty ,4]\cap ([6,\infty]-[-\infty ,5])  = [-\infty ,4] \cap [1,\infty ]=[1,4].$$

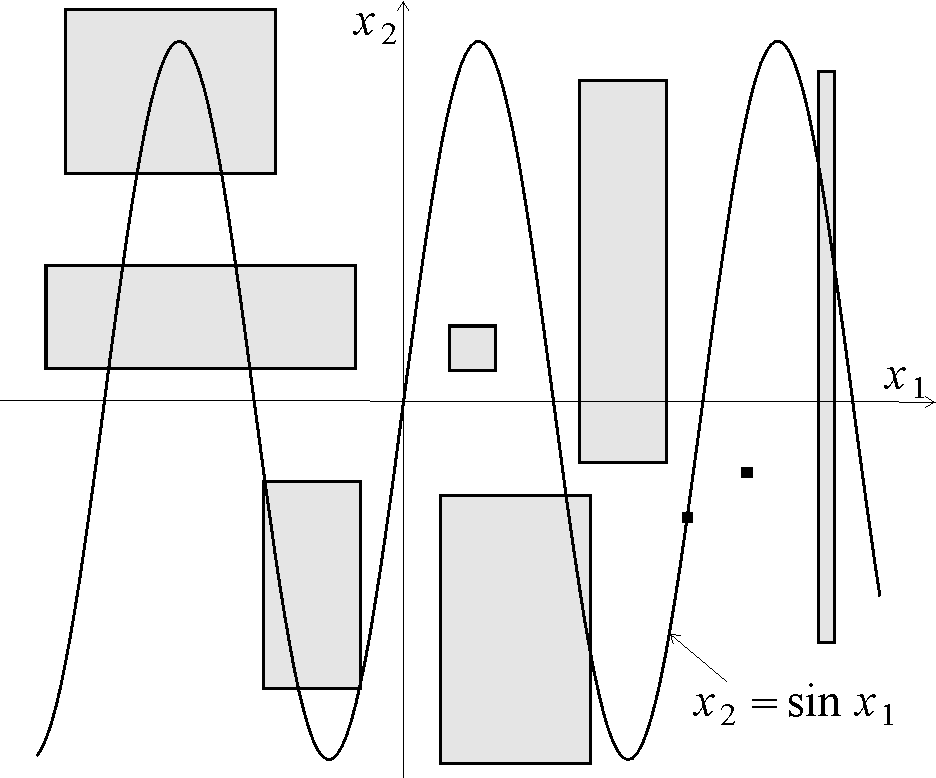
Figure 1: boxes before contraction

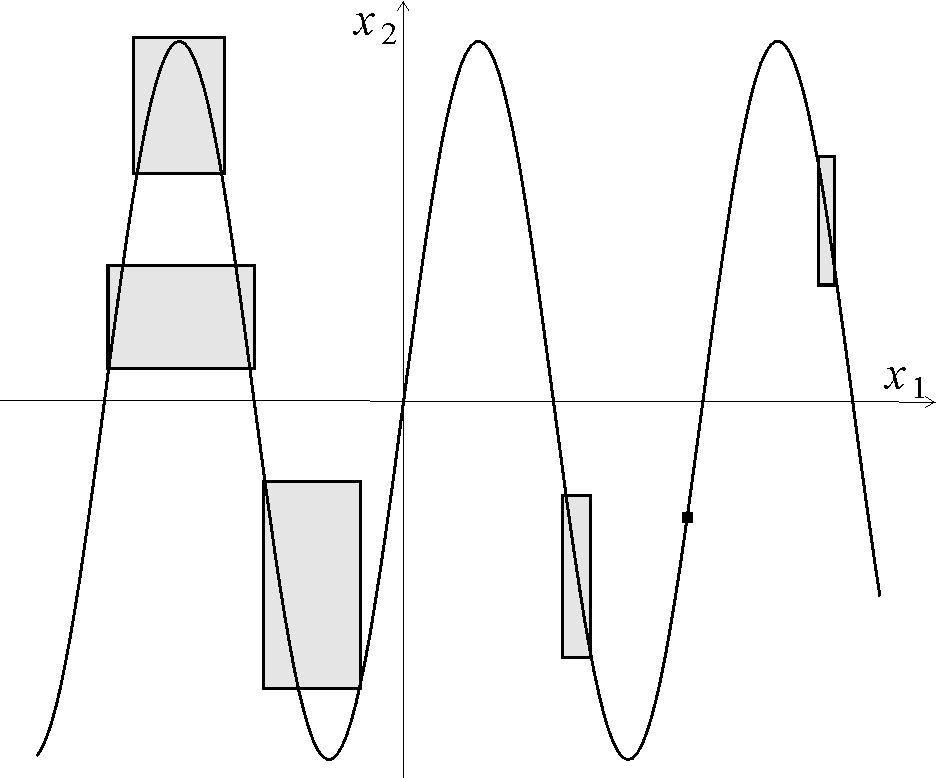
Figure 2: boxes after contraction

For other constraints, a specific algorithm for implementing the atomic contractor should be written. An illustration is the atomic contractor associated to the equation

$$x_2=\sin(x_1),$$

is provided by Figures 1 and 2.

== Decomposition ==
For more complex constraints, a decomposition into atomic constraints (i.e., constraints for which an atomic contractor exists) should be performed. Consider for instance the constraint

$$x+\sin (xy) \leq 0,$$

could be decomposed into

$$a=xy$$

$$b=\sin (a)$$

$$c=x+b.$$

The interval domains that should be associated to the new intermediate variables are

$$a \in [-\infty ,\infty ] ,$$

$$b \in [-1 ,1 ] ,$$

$$c \in [-\infty ,0].$$

== Propagation ==
The principle of the interval propagation is to call all available atomic contractors until no more contraction could be observed. As a result of the Knaster-Tarski theorem, the procedure always converges to intervals which enclose all feasible values for the variables. A formalization of the interval propagation can be made thanks to the contractor algebra. Interval propagation converges quickly to the result and can deal with problems involving several hundred of variables.

== Example ==
Consider the electronic circuit of Figure 3.

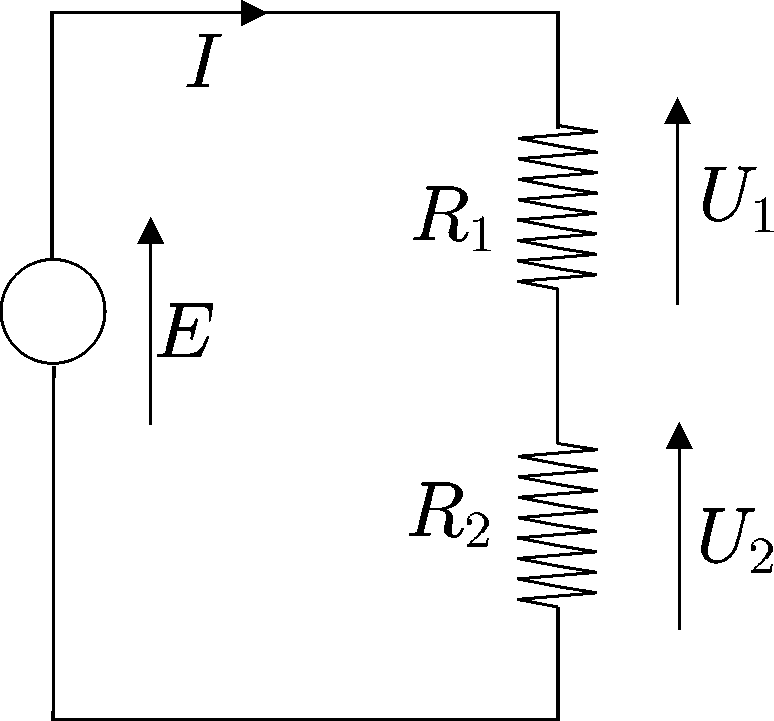
Figure 3: File:Electronic circuit to illustrate the interval propagation

Assume that from different measurements, we know that

$$E \in [23V,26V]$$

$$I\in [4A,8A]$$

$$U_1 \in [10V,11V]$$

$$U_2 \in [14V,17V]$$

$$P \in [124W,130W]$$

$$R_{1} \in [0 \Omega,\infty ]$$

$$R_{2} \in [0 \Omega,\infty ].$$

From the circuit, we have the following equations

$$P=EI$$

$$U_{1}=R_{1}I$$

$$U_{2}=R_{2}I$$

$$E=U_{1}+U_{2}.$$

After performing the interval propagation, we get

$$E \in [24V,26V]$$

$$I \in [4.769A,5.417A]$$

$$U_1 \in [10V,11V]$$

$$U_2 \in [14V,16V]$$

$$P \in [124W,130W]$$

$$R_{1} \in [1.846 \Omega,2.307 \Omega]$$

$$R_{2}\in [2.584 \Omega,3.355 \Omega].$$
