= Eric Walter =

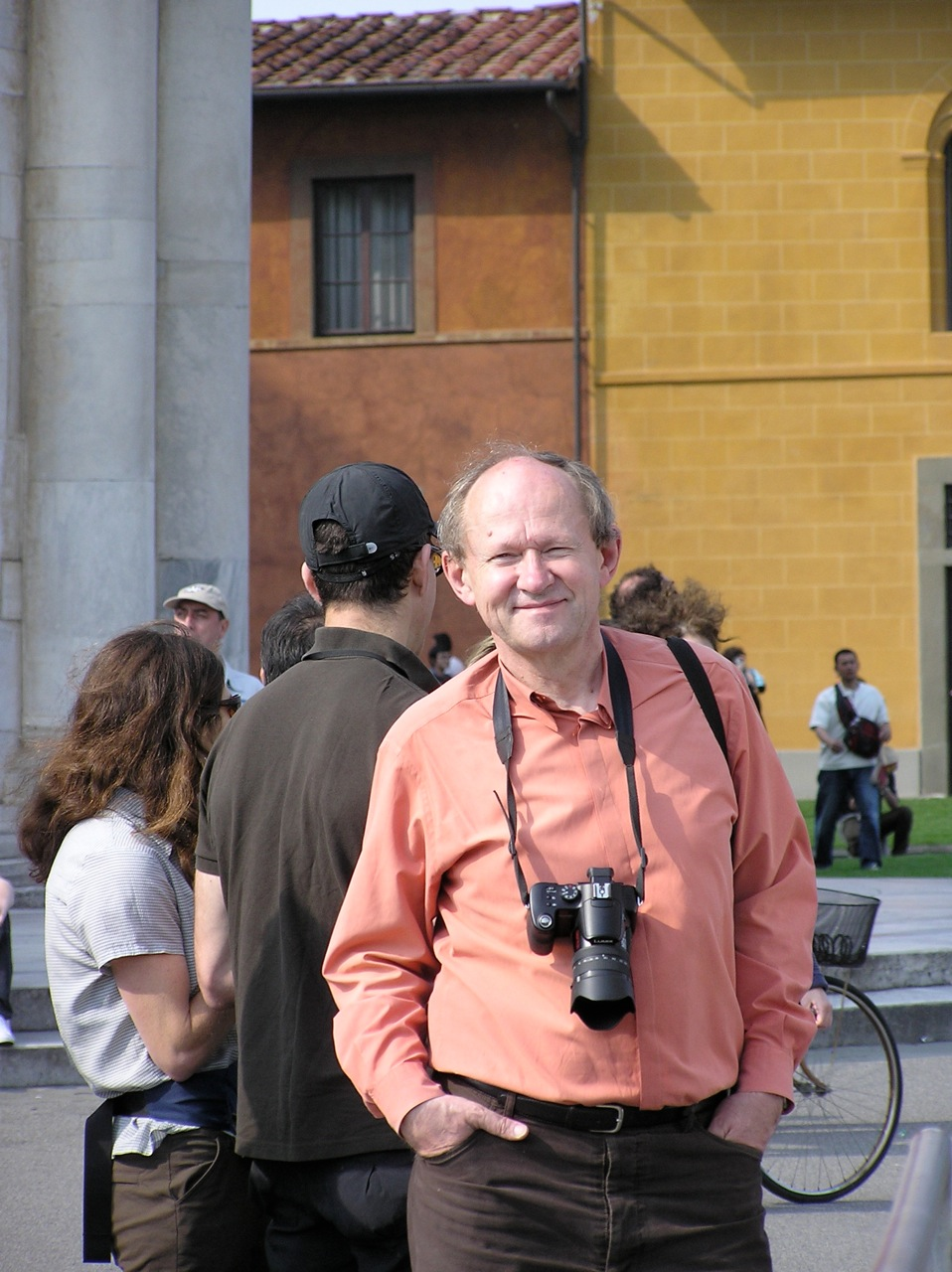
Walter in 2014

Eric Walter (born March 23, 1950) is a researcher of statistics and parameter estimation in the French laboratory Laboratoire des Signaux et Systèmes (UMR 8506).

== Early life ==
Eric Walter was born in Saint-Mandé, France, in 1950. He received the Doctorat d’État degree in Control Theory from the University of Paris Sud, France, in 1980. Between 1973 and 1976, he was assistant professor at the Pierre et Marie Curie University, Paris. Then he entered the CNRS institute as a researcher.

== Career ==
During the preparation of his Ph.D. thesis, Eric Walter studied the notion of identifiability, which makes it possible to address the following question: given the structure of a parametric model and measurements obtained under idealized conditions (noise-free data generated by a model for some unknown "true" value of the parameter vector) can this "true" value of the parameter vector be uniquely recovered from the measurements? Later, with Luc Pronzato and Hélène Piet-Lahanier, he worked on parameter estimation, more specifically on experiment design, dealing with outliers and bounded-error estimation. In 1995, with Luc Jaulin, Olivier Didrit and Michel Kieffer, he introduced the use of interval techniques to solve the problem of set inversion with some application to guaranteed nonlinear estimation. He was head of the Laboratoire des Signaux et Systèmes for 2002–2009. Up to May 2014, he was Directeur de Recherche at CNRS (the French national center for scientific research). His methodological research has found applications in chemical engineering, chemistry, control, image processing, medicine, pharmacokinetics and robotics. During all of his career he has been interested in teaching based on his research and the tools of the trade, and his last book is the most student-oriented of them all.
