= Reflection theorem =

One of several theorems linking the sizes of different ideal class groups

In algebraic number theory, a reflection theorem or Spiegelungssatz (German for reflection theorem – see Spiegel and Satz) is one of a collection of theorems linking the sizes of different ideal class groups (or ray class groups), or the sizes of different isotypic components of a class group. The original example is due to Ernst Eduard Kummer, who showed that the class number of the cyclotomic field $\mathbb{Q} \left( \zeta_p \right)$, with p a prime number, will be divisible by p if the class number of the maximal real subfield $\mathbb{Q} \left( \zeta_p \right)^{+}$ is. Another example is due to Scholz. A simplified version of his theorem states that if 3 divides the class number of a real quadratic field $\mathbb{Q} \left( \sqrt{d} \right)$, then 3 also divides the class number of the imaginary quadratic field $\mathbb{Q} \left( \sqrt{-3d} \right)$.

== Leopoldt's Spiegelungssatz ==
Both of the above results are generalized by Leopoldt's "Spiegelungssatz", which relates the p-ranks of different isotypic components of the class group of a number field considered as a module over the Galois group of a Galois extension.

Let L/K be a finite Galois extension of number fields, with group G, degree prime to p and L containing the p-th roots of unity. Let A be the p-Sylow subgroup of the class group of L. Let φ run over the irreducible characters of the group ring Q_{p}[G] and let A_{φ} denote the corresponding direct summands of A. For any φ let q = p^{φ(1)} and let the G-rank e_{φ} be the exponent in the index

$$[ A_\phi : A_\phi^p ] = q^{e_\phi} .$$

Let ω be the character of G

$$\zeta^g = \zeta^{\omega(g)} \text{ for } \zeta \in \mu_p .$$

The reflection (Spiegelung) φ^{*} is defined by

$$\phi^*(g) = \omega(g) \phi(g^{-1}) .$$

Let E be the unit group of K. We say that ε is "primary" if $K(\sqrt[p]\epsilon)/K$ is unramified, and let E_{0} denote the group of primary units modulo E^{p}. Let δ_{φ} denote the G-rank of the φ component of E_{0}.

The Spiegelungssatz states that

$$| e_{\phi^*} - e_\phi | \le \delta_\phi .$$

== Extensions ==
Extensions of this Spiegelungssatz were given by Oriat and Oriat-Satge, where class groups were no longer associated with characters of the Galois group of K/k, but rather by ideals in a group ring over the Galois group of K/k. Leopoldt's Spiegelungssatz was generalized in a different direction by Kuroda, who extended it to a statement about ray class groups. This was further developed into the very general "T-S reflection theorem" of Georges Gras. Kenkichi Iwasawa also provided an Iwasawa-theoretic reflection theorem.
