= NLPD =

NLPD may refer to:

- National Language Promotion Department, a regulatory institution in Pakistan that promotes the use of the Urdu language.
- Negative log predictive density, a method for assessing the quality of predictions by machine learning and statistical models.
