= Satz (disambiguation) =

Satz may refer to:

- Satz, a formal section in music analysis
- Satz (SAT solver), a well known SAT instance solver

== People ==
- Alexander Satz (1941–2007), Russian pianist and educator
- Debra Satz, American philosopher
- Ludwig Satz (1891–1944), Yiddish theatre performer
- Michael Satz (20th century), American politician
- Wayne Thomas Satz (1945–1992), American journalist

== See also ==
- Ursatz
- Proposition (mathematics) (English translation of German word Satz)
