= MAX-3LIN-EQN =

MAX-3LIN-EQN is a problem in Computational complexity theory where the input is a system of linear equations (modulo 2). Each equation contains at most 3 variables. The problem is to find an assignment to the variables that satisfies the maximum number of equations.

This problem is closely related to the MAX-3SAT problem. It is NP-hard to approximate MAX-3LIN-EQN with ratio (1/2 + δ) for any δ > 0.

== See also ==
- PCP (complexity)
