= Set inversion =

Mathematical problem of finding the set mapped by a specified function to a certain range

In mathematics, set inversion is the problem of characterizing the preimage X of a set Y by a function f, i.e., X = f^{−1}(Y ) = {x ∈ R^{n} | f(x) ∈ Y }. It can also be viewed as the problem of describing the solution set of the quantified constraint "Y(f (x))", where Y(y) is a constraint, e.g. an inequality, describing the set Y.

In most applications, f is a function from R^{n} to R^{p} and the set Y is a box of R^{p} (i.e. a Cartesian product of p intervals of R).

When f is nonlinear the set inversion problem can be solved using interval analysis combined with a branch-and-bound algorithm.

The main idea consists in building a paving of R^{p} made with non-overlapping boxes. For each box [x], we perform the following tests:

1. if f ([x]) ⊂ Y we conclude that [x] ⊂ X;
2. if f ([x]) ∩ Y = ∅ we conclude that [x] ∩ X = ∅;
3. Otherwise, the box [x] the box is bisected except if its width is smaller than a given precision.

To check the two first tests, we need an interval extension (or an inclusion function) [f ] for f. Classified boxes are stored into subpavings, i.e., union of non-overlapping boxes. The algorithm can be made more efficient by replacing the inclusion tests by contractors.

== Example ==
The set X = f ^{−1}([4,9]) where f (x_{1}, x_{2}) = x^{2}_{1} + x^{2}_{2} is represented on the figure.

For instance, since [−2,1]^{2} + [4,5]^{2} = [0,4] + [16,25] = [16,29] does not intersect the interval [4,9], we conclude that the box [−2,1] × [4,5] is outside X. Since [−1,1]^{2} + [2,√5]^{2} = [0,1] + [4,5] = [4,6] is inside [4,9], we conclude that the whole box [−1,1] × [2,√5] is inside X.

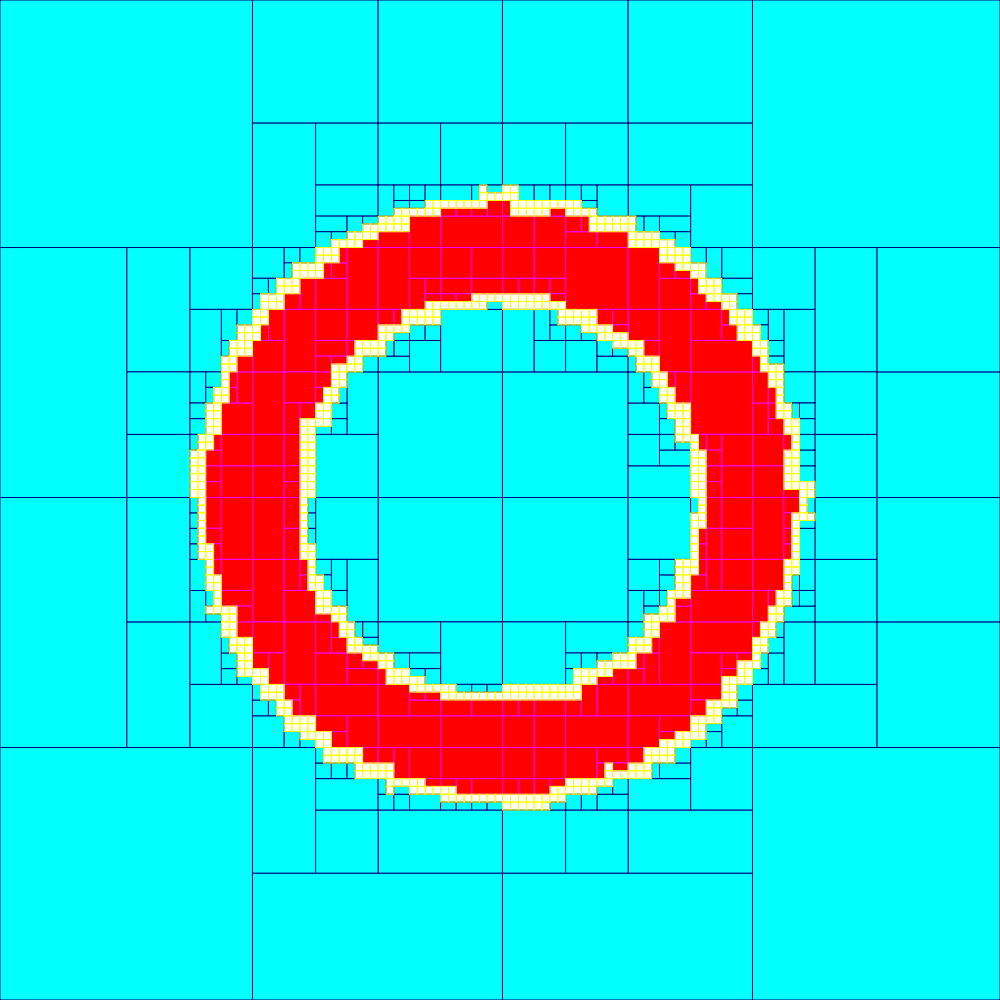
A ring defined as a set inversion problem

== Application ==
Set inversion is mainly used for path planning, for nonlinear parameter set estimation, for localization or for the characterization of stability domains of linear dynamical systems.
