= Subpaving =

Geometrical object

In mathematics, a subpaving is a set of nonoverlapping boxes of R⁺. A subset X of Rⁿ can be approximated by two subpavings X⁻ and X⁺ such that
X⁻ ⊂ X ⊂ X⁺.

In R¹ the boxes are line segments, in R² rectangles and in Rⁿ hyperrectangles. A R² subpaving can be also a "non-regular tiling by rectangles", when it has no holes.

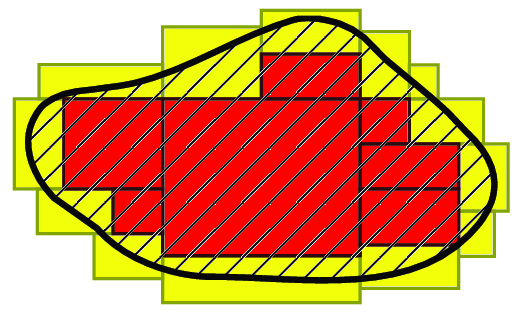
Bracketing of the hatched set X between two subpavings. Red boxes: inner subpaving. Red and yellow: outer subpaving. The difference, outer minus inner, is a boundary approximation.

Boxes present the advantage of being very easily manipulated by computers, as they form the heart of interval analysis. Many interval algorithms naturally provide solutions that are regular subpavings.

In computation, a well-known application of subpaving in R² is the Quadtree data structure. In image tracing context and other applications is important to see X⁻ as topological interior, as illustrated.

== Example ==
The three figures on the right below show an approximation of the set
X = {(x_{1}, x_{2}) ∈ R^{2} | x^{2}_{1} + x^{2}_{2} + sin(x_{1} + x_{2}) ∈ [4,9]}
with different accuracies. The set X⁻ corresponds to red boxes and the set X⁺ contains all red and yellow boxes.

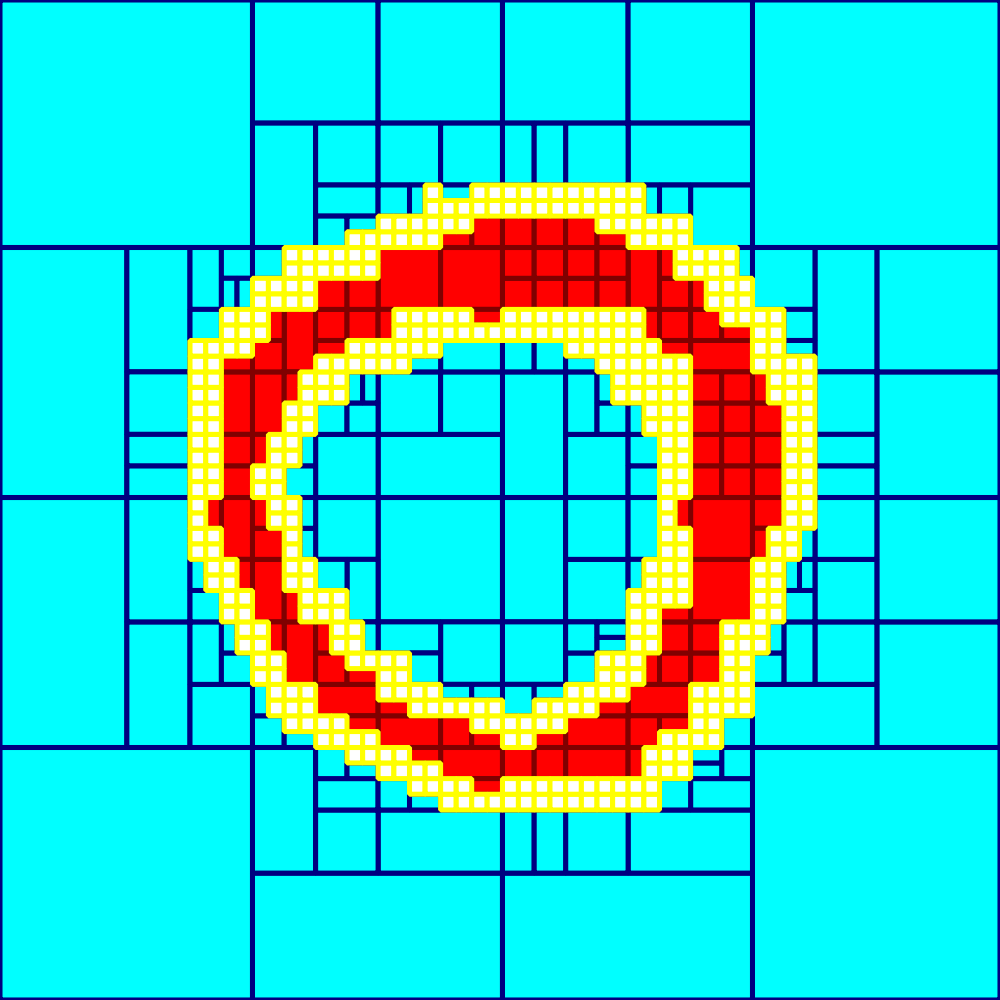
Subpavings which bracket a set with a low resolution

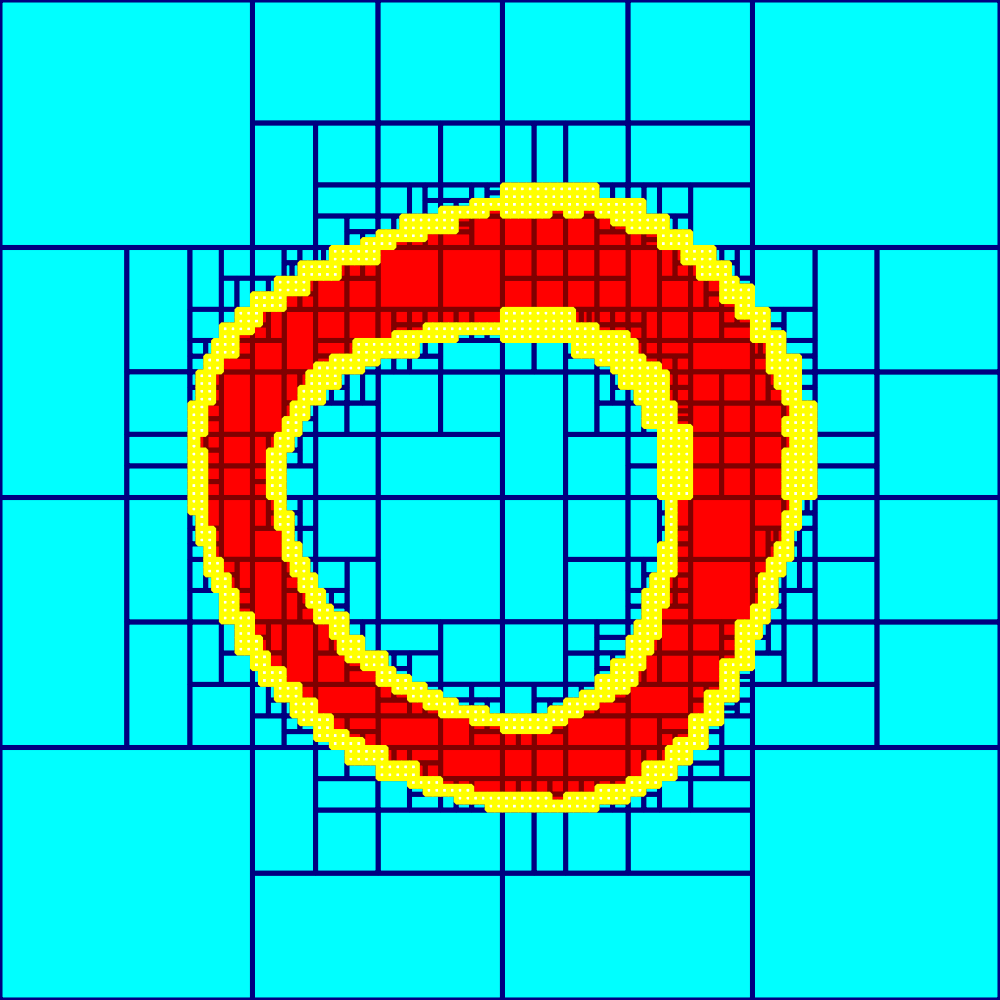
Subpavings which bracket the same set with a moderate resolution

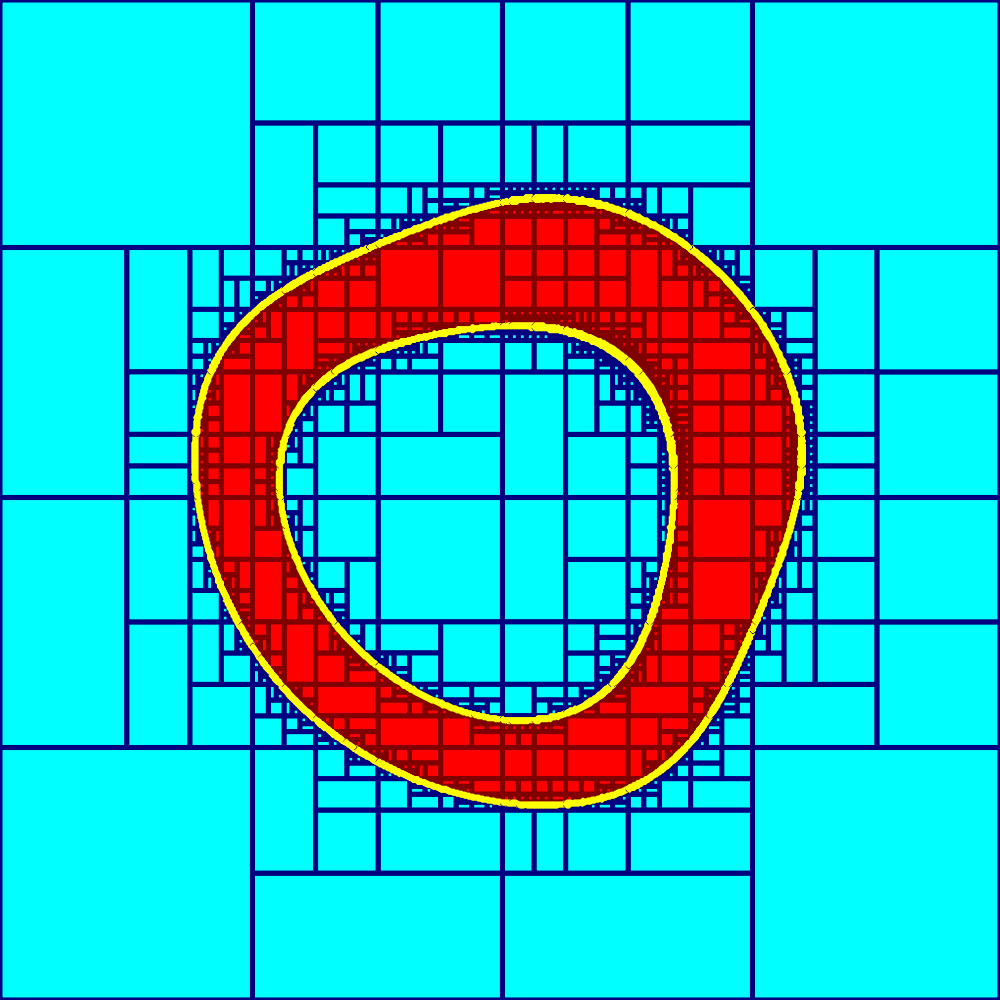
Subpavings which bracket the set with a high resolution

Combined with interval-based methods, subpavings are used to approximate the solution set of non-linear problems such as set inversion problems. Subpavings can also be used to prove that a set defined by nonlinear inequalities is path connected, to provide topological properties of such sets, to solve piano-mover's problems or to implement set computation.
