= MAX-3SAT =

Problem in computer science

MAX-3SAT is a problem in the computational complexity subfield of computer science. It generalises the Boolean satisfiability problem (SAT) which is a decision problem considered in complexity theory. It is defined as:

Given a 3-CNF formula Φ (i.e. with at most 3 variables per clause), find an assignment that satisfies the largest number of clauses.

MAX-3SAT is a canonical complete problem for the complexity class MAXSNP (shown complete in Papadimitriou pg. 314).

== Approximability ==
The decision version of MAX-3SAT is NP-complete. Therefore, a polynomial-time solution can only be achieved if P = NP. An approximation within a factor of 2 can be achieved with this simple algorithm, however:

- Output the solution in which most clauses are satisfied, when either all variables = TRUE or all variables = FALSE.
- Every clause is satisfied by one of the two solutions, therefore one solution satisfies at least half of the clauses.

The Karloff-Zwick algorithm runs in polynomial-time and satisfies ≥ 7/8 of the clauses. While this algorithm is randomized, it can be derandomized using, e.g., the techniques from to yield a deterministic (polynomial-time) algorithm with the same approximation guarantees.

== Theorem 1 (inapproximability) ==
The PCP theorem implies that there exists an ε > 0 such that (1-ε)-approximation of MAX-3SAT is NP-hard.

Proof:

Any NP-complete problem $L \in \mathsf{PCP}(O(\log (n)), O(1))$ by the PCP theorem. For x ∈ L, a 3-CNF formula Ψ_{x} is constructed so that

- x ∈ L ⇒ Ψ_{x} is satisfiable
- x ∉ L ⇒ no more than (1-ε)m clauses of Ψ_{x} are satisfiable.

The Verifier V reads all required bits at once i.e. makes non-adaptive queries. This is valid because the number of queries remains constant.

- Let q be the number of queries.
- Enumerating all random strings R_{i} ∈ V, we obtain poly(x) strings since the length of each string $r(x) = O(\log |x|)$.
- For each R_{i}
  - V chooses q positions i_{1},...,i_{q} and a Boolean function f_{R}: {0,1}^{q}->{0,1} and accepts if and only if f_{R}(π(i_{1},...,i_{q})). Here π refers to the proof obtained from the Oracle.

Next we try to find a Boolean formula to simulate this. We introduce Boolean variables x_{1},...,x_{l}, where l is the length of the proof. To demonstrate that the Verifier runs in Probabilistic polynomial-time, we need a correspondence between the number of satisfiable clauses and the probability the Verifier accepts.

- For every R, add clauses representing f_{R}(x_{i1},...,x_{iq}) using 2^{q} SAT clauses. Clauses of length q are converted to length 3 by adding new (auxiliary) variables e.g. x_{2} ∨ x_{10} ∨ x_{11} ∨ x_{12} = ( x_{2} ∨ x_{10} ∨ y_{R}) ∧ ( y̅_{R} ∨ x_{11} ∨ x_{12}). This requires a maximum of q2^{q} 3-SAT clauses.
- If z ∈ L then
  - there is a proof π such that V^{π} (z) accepts for every R_{i}.
  - All clauses are satisfied if x_{i} = π(i) and the auxiliary variables are added correctly.
- If input z ∉ L then
  - For every assignment to x_{1},...,x_{l} and y_{R}'s, the corresponding proof π(i) = x_{i} causes the Verifier to reject for half of all R ∈ {0,1}^{r(|z|)}.
    - For each R, one clause representing f_{R} fails.
    - Therefore, a fraction $\frac{1}{2} \frac{1}{q2^{q}}$ of clauses fails.

It can be concluded that if this holds for every NP-complete problem then the PCP theorem must be true.

== Theorem 2 ==
Håstad demonstrates a tighter result than Theorem 1 i.e. the best known value for ε.

He constructs a PCP Verifier for 3-SAT that reads only 3 bits from the Proof.

For every ε > 0, there is a PCP-verifier M for 3-SAT that reads a random string r of length $O(\log(n))$ and computes query positions i_{r}, j_{r}, k_{r} in the proof π and a bit b_{r}. It accepts if and only if π(i_{r}) ⊕ π(j_{r}) ⊕ π(k_{r}) = b_{r}.

The Verifier has completeness (1−ε) and soundness 1/2 + ε (refer to PCP (complexity)). The Verifier satisfies

$$z \in L \implies \exists \pi Pr[V^{\pi} (z) = 1] \ge 1 - \epsilon$$

$$z \not \in L \implies \forall \pi Pr[V^{\pi} (z) = 1] \le \frac{1}{2} + \epsilon$$

If the first of these two equations were equated to "=1" as usual, one could find a proof π by solving a system of linear equations (see MAX-3LIN-EQN) implying P = NP.

- If z ∈ L, a fraction ≥ (1 − ε) of clauses are satisfied.
- If z ∉ L, then for a (1/2 − ε) fraction of R, 1/4 clauses are contradicted.

This is enough to prove the hardness of approximation ratio

$$\frac{1-\frac{1}{4}(\frac{1}{2}-\epsilon)}{1-\epsilon} = \frac{7}{8} + \epsilon'$$

== Related problems ==
MAX-3SAT(B) is the restricted special case of MAX-3SAT where every variable occurs in at most B clauses. Before the PCP theorem was proven, Papadimitriou and Yannakakis showed that for some fixed constant B, this problem is MAX SNP-hard. Consequently, with the PCP theorem, it is also APX-hard. This is useful because MAX-3SAT(B) can often be used to obtain a PTAS-preserving reduction in a way that MAX-3SAT cannot. Proofs for explicit values of B include: all B ≥ 13, and all B ≥ 3 (which is best possible).

Moreover, although the decision problem 2SAT is solvable in polynomial time, MAX-2SAT(3) is also APX-hard.

The best possible approximation ratio for MAX-3SAT(B), as a function of B, is at least $7/8+\Omega(1/B)$ and at most $7/8+O(1/\sqrt{B})$, unless NP=RP. Some explicit bounds on the approximability constants for certain values of B are known. Berman, Karpinski and Scott proved that for the "critical" instances of MAX-3SAT in which each literal occurs exactly twice, and each clause is exactly of size 3, the problem is approximation hard for some constant factor.

MAX-EkSAT is a parameterized version of MAX-3SAT where every clause has exactly k literals, for k ≥ 3. It can be efficiently approximated with approximation ratio $1- (1/2)^{k}$ using ideas from coding theory.

It has been proved that random instances of MAX-3SAT can be approximated to within factor 8/9.
