= Satz (SAT solver) =

SatZ is a well known SAT instance solver. It was developed by Prof. Chu Min Li, a computer science researcher. The Z stands for the last version of SAT solvers.
