= Primal graph =

Primal graph may refer to:

- Primal graph (hypergraphs) of a hypergraph
- A primal graph may be the planar graph from which a dual graph is formed
- Primal constraint graph
