= Patrick Prosser =

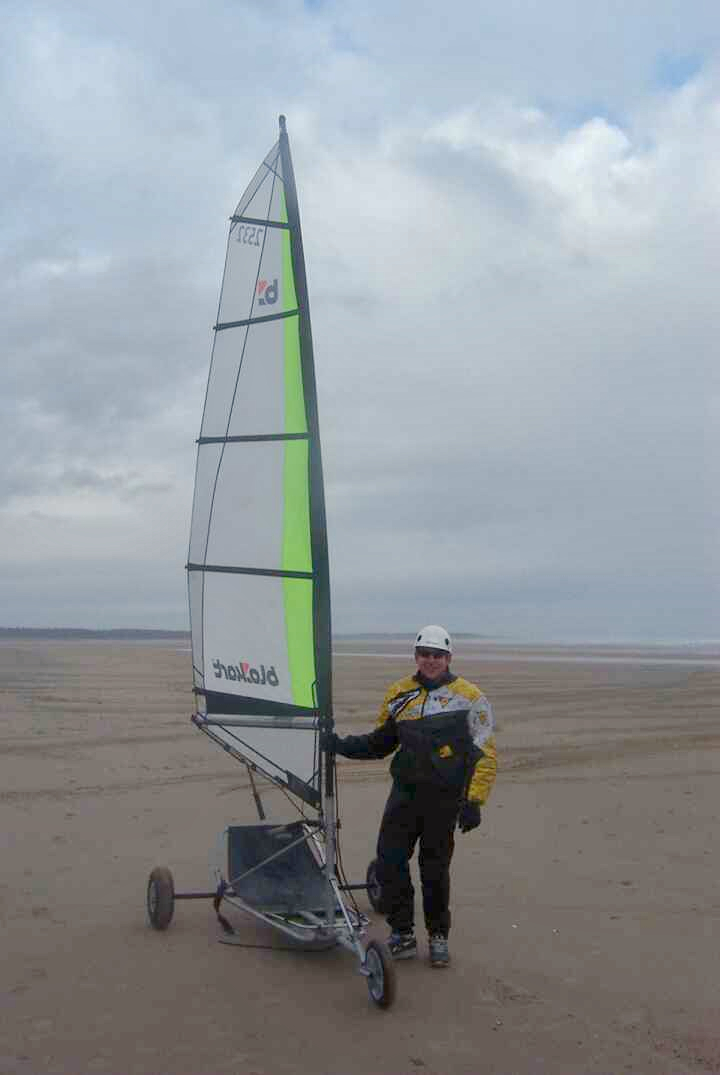
- Prosser in 2003
- Born: 8 September 1952 (age 73); Glasgow, Scotland
- Education: Strathclyde University
- Known for: Conflict-directed backjumping
- Scientific career
- Fields: Constraint programming
- Workplaces: University of Glasgow
- Doctoral advisor: Iain Buchanan

Patrick Prosser (born 8 September 1952) is a computer scientist who spent the bulk of his career at the University of Glasgow. His research has centred on constraint programming, although it has extended into the application of those techniques into other areas. For his major contributions to the theory and practice of constraint programming, Patrick was awarded the Association for Constraint Programming's Research Excellence Award on 15 September 2011: he is only the sixth recipient of this award. He gave a prerecorded acceptance speech, which is available on YouTube.

His most notable contribution is his invention of conflict-directed backjumping, an advanced technique for reducing search in constraint problems by avoiding unnecessary work on backtracking. His 1993 paper describing this has been widely cited.

Other areas of constraint programming he has researched include the identification of hard problems and techniques for solving vehicle routing problems. His interest in applications of constraint programming has included (for example) how it can be used in computing species trees.

Amongst his recreations is kite flying as a founder of the Kite Club of Scotland. He has written about the Tetrahedral kite.
