= Zebra Puzzle =

Logic puzzle

The Zebra Puzzle is a well-known logic puzzle. Many versions of the puzzle exist, including a version published in Life International magazine on December 17, 1962. The March 25, 1963, issue of Life contained the solution and the names of several hundred successful solvers from around the world.

The puzzle is often called Einstein's Puzzle or Einstein's Riddle because, according to an urban legend, it was invented by Albert Einstein as a boy; it is also sometimes attributed to Lewis Carroll. However, there is no evidence for either person's authorship, and the Life International version of the puzzle mentions brands of cigarettes that did not exist during Carroll's lifetime or Einstein's boyhood.

The Zebra puzzle has been used as a benchmark in the evaluation of computer algorithms for solving constraint satisfaction problems. More recently, it has been used as a benchmark for logical reasoning capabilities of large language models.

== Description ==
The following version of the puzzle appeared in Life International in 1962:

1. There are five houses.
2. The Englishman lives in the red house.
3. The Spaniard owns the dog.
4. Coffee is drunk in the green house.
5. The Ukrainian drinks tea.
6. The green house is immediately to the right of the ivory house.
7. The Old Gold smoker owns snails.
8. Kools are smoked in the yellow house.
9. Milk is drunk in the middle house.
10. The Norwegian lives in the first house.
11. The man who smokes Chesterfields lives in the house next to the man with the fox.
12. Kools are smoked in the house next to the house where the horse is kept.
13. The Lucky Strike smoker drinks orange juice.
14. The Japanese smokes Parliaments.
15. The Norwegian lives next to the blue house.

Now, who drinks water? Who owns the zebra?

In the interest of clarity, it must be added that each of the five houses is painted a different color, and their inhabitants are of different national extractions, own different pets, drink different beverages and smoke different brands of American cigarets [sic]. One other thing: in statement 6, right means your right.

— Life International, December 17, 1962

== Solution ==
Assuming that one person drinks water and one owns a zebra, then it is possible not only to deduce the answers to the two questions, but to figure out a complete solution of who lives where, in what color house, keeping what pet, drinking what drink, and smoking what brand of cigarettes. By considering the clues a few at a time, it is possible to slowly build inferences that incrementally complete the puzzle's unique correct solution. For example, by clue 10, the Norwegian lives in house #1, and by clue 15, house #2 must be blue. The Norwegian's house therefore cannot be blue, nor can it be red, where the Englishman lives (clue 2), or green or ivory, which are next to each other (clue 6). It must therefore be yellow, which means the Norwegian also smokes Kools (clue 8).

The March 25, 1963, issue of Life International contained the following solution, and the names of several hundred solvers from around the world.

House	1	2	3	4	5
Color	Yellow	Blue	Red	Ivory	Green
Nationality	Norwegian	Ukrainian	Englishman	Spaniard	Japanese
Drink	Water	Tea	Milk	Orange juice	Coffee
Smoke	Kools	Chesterfield	Old Gold	Lucky Strike	Parliament
Pet	Fox	Horse	Snails	Dog	Zebra

== Other versions ==
Other versions of the puzzle have various differences from the Life International puzzle, in which various colors, nationalities, cigarette brands, drinks, and pets are substituted, or the clues are given in a different order. These do not change the logic of the puzzle.

A slightly simplified version of this puzzle appears in the video game Dishonored 2, where the player character has to solve it to unlock a gate to an abandoned mansion.

Some versions of the puzzle indicate that the green house is on the left of the ivory house, instead of on the right of it.
