= Hidato =

Logic puzzle

A Hidato puzzle...

...and its solution

Hidato (Hebrew: חידאתו, originating from the Hebrew word Hida=Riddle), also known as Hidoku, is a logic puzzle game invented by Dr. Gyora M. Benedek, an Israeli mathematician. The goal of Hidato is to fill the grid with consecutive numbers that connect horizontally, vertically, or diagonally. The name Hidato is a registered trademark. Some publishers use different names for this puzzle (and variants), such as Number Snake, Snakepit (both of which play on the game's similarity in concept to the video game Snake), Jadium, and Numbrix.

== About the puzzle ==
In Hidato, a grid of cells is given. It is usually a square grid, like in Sudoku or Kakuro, but it can also be a hexagonal grid or include any shaped cells that form a tessellation. The grid can have an irregular boundary and inner holes (like a disc), but it must be one contiguous piece.

The goal is to fill the grid with a series of consecutive numbers adjacent to each other vertically, horizontally, or diagonally.

In every Hidato puzzle, the smallest and largest numbers are given on the grid. There are also other given numbers on the grid (with values between the smallest and the highest) to help direct the player how to start the solution and to ensure that Hidato has only one solution.

The above condition on the smallest and largest numbers is sometimes relaxed: only their values could be given, without their positions on the grid (of course, the difference between these values must be equal to the number of cells in the grid minus one). This may lead to harder puzzles.

Every well-formed Hidato puzzle should have exactly one solution. Moreover, a Hidato puzzle intended for human solvers should have a solution that can be found by (more or less) simple logic. However, there exist very hard Hidato puzzles, even of small size.

== Distribution ==
Numbrix puzzles, which appear in Parade magazine, are similar to Hidato except that diagonal moves are not allowed.(vos Savant has only used 7×7 and 9×9 grids). Jadium puzzles (formerly Snakepit puzzles), created by Jeff Marchant, are a more difficult version of Numbrix with fewer given numbers and have appeared on the Parade web site regularly since 2014, along with a daily online version of Numbrix.

== Solving techniques ==
As in many logic puzzles, the basic resolution technique consists of analyzing the possibilities for each number of being present in each cell. When a cell can contain only one number (Naked Single) or when a number has only one possible place (Hidden Single), it can be asserted as belonging to the solution.

One key to the solution is, it does not have to be built in ascending (or descending) order; it can be built piecewise, with pieces starting from different givens.

As in the Sudoku case, the resolution of harder Hidato or Numbrix puzzles requires the use of more complex techniques - in particular of various types of chain patterns.
