= Binary constraint =

A binary constraint, in mathematical optimization, is a constraint that involves exactly two variables.

For example, consider the n-queens problem, where the goal is to place n chess queens on an n-by-n chessboard such that none of the queens can attack each other (horizontally, vertically, or diagonally). The formal set of constraints are therefore "Queen 1 can't attack Queen 2", "Queen 1 can't attack Queen 3", and so on between all pairs of queens. Each constraint in this problem is binary, in that it only considers the placement of two individual queens.

Linear programs in which all constraints are binary can be solved in strongly polynomial time, a result that is not known to be true for more general linear programs.
