= DriveWorks =

Design automation software for SOLIDWORKS

- Developer: DriveWorks Ltd. (subsidiary of Bechtle AG)
- Release: 2001; 25 years ago
- Stable release: DriveWorks 23 / September 1, 2023
- Operating system: Microsoft Windows
- Available in: English
- Type: Design automation, Product configurator
- License: Proprietary
- Website: driveworks.co.uk

DriveWorks is a design automation and product configuration software suite developed for SOLIDWORKS, a computer-aided design platform. The software uses a rules-based approach to capture and automate SOLIDWORKS design parameters for creating product variants and generating manufacturing documentation. DriveWorks functions as a configure, price, and quote (CPQ) system for complex mechanical products, enabling mass customization through automated design generation.

The software operates as a SOLIDWORKS Certified Gold Partner product and comprises three main tiers: DriveWorksXpress (included free with SOLIDWORKS), DriveWorks Solo (mid-tier automation), and DriveWorks Pro (enterprise configuration platform).

Founded in 2001 and headquartered in Warrington, United Kingdom, DriveWorks was acquired by German IT-services company Bechtle AG in October 2024.

== History ==
DriveWorks Ltd. was founded in 2001 to provide automation tools for SOLIDWORKS CAD software. The company is registered with Companies House under number 04716162. The company became a SOLIDWORKS Certified Gold Partner in 2002.

=== Product development and technical evolution ===
DriveWorks 11 (released 2011) introduced form controls and expanded rules engine functionality. DriveWorks 19 (2019) replaced the SQL Compact database with SQLite. DriveWorks 20 (2020) introduced web-based form technology and DriveWorks Apps. DriveWorks 21 (2021) unified web and desktop form technology with WebView2 integration and added CSS styling capabilities. DriveWorks 22 (2022) added form controls and SOLIDWORKS 2024 support. DriveWorks 23 (2023) expanded SOLIDWORKS integration.

In 2008, Dassault Systèmes included DriveWorksXpress, the entry-level design automation tool, free with every license of SOLIDWORKS desktop CAD software. This integration made basic design automation capabilities available to all SOLIDWORKS users without additional cost.

=== Company growth and acquisition ===
In 2019, DriveWorks was awarded the Queen's Awards for Enterprise in two categories: Innovation for its design automation technology, and International Trade for its global market expansion. The company was one of six businesses that year to win awards in both categories.

In 2021, DriveWorks received a £4 million investment from British Growth Fund (BGF).

In October 2024, DriveWorks Ltd. was acquired by Bechtle AG, a German IT-services company headquartered in Neckarsulm. The acquisition followed the earlier £4 million investment by British Growth Fund (BGF) in 2021, which achieved a 2.7× return on investment. At the time of acquisition, DriveWorks had approximately 59 employees and generated €6.5 million in revenue during the 2023/24 fiscal year. The company continues to operate as an independent entity under Bechtle ownership as part of Bechtle's UK expansion strategy.

== Industry applications ==
DriveWorks is used by manufacturers across various industries for configurable products and design automation. Applications include furniture manufacturing, cleanroom and HVAC equipment, food processing equipment, metal products and fencing, vehicle equipment, custom machinery, and industrial equipment.

The software has been applied in medical and life sciences equipment design, accessibility products, chimney and ventilation systems, and fastener configuration. Academic research has documented DriveWorks applications in nuclear engineering, with Wrigley et al. (2019) referencing the software in knowledge-based engineering approaches for nuclear power plant design automation.

== Academic recognition ==
DriveWorks has been referenced in academic research and engineering education. Seven academic publications have documented DriveWorks implementations across various engineering disciplines from 2011 to 2025.

=== Engineering research publications ===
Academic research has documented DriveWorks applications in process automation, parametric design, and knowledge-based engineering. Persson and Dulla (2025) examined DriveWorks implementation for automated design and drawing generation at INOR, a Swedish industrial equipment manufacturer. Lombard (2011) included DriveWorks automation features in the technical reference "SolidWorks 2011 Assemblies Bible", documenting its integration capabilities and automation workflows within the SOLIDWORKS ecosystem. Abdelwahab (2025) compared DriveWorks with SolidWorks table methods for ASME Section VIII pressure vessel design automation. Grkovic et al. (2025) demonstrated DriveWorks integration for automated configuration of modular strongroom security systems.

=== Engineering education applications ===
DriveWorks has been incorporated into engineering education curricula for teaching design automation and CAD methodologies. Mustonen (2025) developed rule-based design solutions for automated 3D modeling of Flowrox SKH knife gate valve bodies, demonstrating parametric design principles in mechanical engineering education. Szwalek and Carducci (2025) incorporated DriveWorks in mechanical engineering curriculum for design review and CAD project methodologies.

== See also ==
=== Related concepts ===
- SOLIDWORKS
- Computer-aided design
- Computer-automated design
- Product lifecycle management
- Configure, price and quote
- Product configurator
- Configurator
- Knowledge-based configuration
- Knowledge-based engineering
- Configuration lifecycle management
- Mass customization
- Parametric design
- Computer-aided manufacturing
- Enterprise resource planning

=== Related software ===
- pCon.planner – characteristic-based product configurator for interior design
- HiCAD – CAD system with associated product configurator
- BigMachines – CPQ software (acquired by Oracle)
- Cincom Systems – CPQ software provider
- PROS (company) – CPQ software provider (acquired Cameleon Software)
