= Custom-fit =

Item with a personalized shape and size

Custom-fit means personalized with regard to shape and size. A customized product would imply the modification of some of its characteristics according to the customers requirements such as with a custom car. However, when fit is added to the term, customization could give the idea of both the geometric characteristics of the body and the individual customer requirements, e.g., the steering wheel of the Formula 1 driver Fernando Alonso.

The custom-fit concept can be understood as the idea of offering one-of-a-kind products that, due to their intrinsic characteristics and use, can be totally adapted to geometric characteristics in order to meet the user requirements.

With this new concept, industry moves from a resource based manufacturing system to a knowledge based manufacturing system and from mass production to individual production. This encourages the Lean Production trend as established by Toyota, or in other words, an efficiency-based production.

== Research ==
There are some studies referring to the positive impacts this concept would have on society:

- Customised Motorcycle Seats
- Orthopaedic Profession

The research studies found in February 2008 on the subject are the following:

- Customised Motorcycle and Helmet
- Knee and Maxillo-facial Implants and Prosthetics Sockets

== Technical Tools ==
=== Data Capturing ===
The process starts with the capturing of data directly from the user by CAD techniques with the ultimate aim of manufacturing products using CAM techniques.

=== Process Design and Validation ===
- Converting scanned data directly and automatically into final models ready for printing: Digital Cad Approach and Hybrid Approach.
- Representing Structure for Functionally Graded Material:
1. Interface Innerspace developed by TNO which integrates the RDT Centers in The Netherlands.
2. Multi Phase Topology Optimisation, designed by Fraunhofer (comparable to TNO in Germany).
3. Finite Element Representation Finite element analysis used by Materialise in Belgium.
- A rapid manufacturing interface called Slice Raster Interface, also designed by Materialise.

Although all these developments have been of great interest, the RM-processes have not fallen behind, due to improvement of new Rapid Prototyping Direct digital manufacturing techniques.

=== Rapid Manufacturing Systems, Tools and Materials ===
- The Metal Printing Process developed by SINTEF in Norway, produces 3D products with metal powder with different graduation, sintered layer-by-layer.

MPP aims to become the equivalent of a high speed 3D-printer that produces three-dimensional objects directly from powder materials. This technique is based on the process principles of xerographic printers, (for example, laser or LED printers) that combine electrostatic printing with photography. The MPP process approach uses the same fundamental principles to build solid objects on a layer-by-layer basis. Layers of powder materials are generated by attracting different metal- and/or ceramic powders to their respective position on a charged pattern on a photoreceptor by means of an electrostatic field. The attracted layer is transferred to a punch and transported to the consolidation unit where each layer of part material is sintered onto the previous by pressure and heat. The procedure is repeated layer-by-layer until the three-dimensional object is fully formed and consolidated.

MPP has the ability to print different powders within the same layer and progressively change from one material to another, i.e., producing a functionally graded material. In addition to this, MPP uses external pressure to speed the densification process (sintering), which allows manufacturing with a wide range of materials and opens the possibility to produce unique material combinations and microstructures.

- The High Viscosity Inkjet printing developed by TNO has the capability of printing with one or more materials with graded structures in a single process using additive technology.

It has several print heads that produce continuous streams of material droplets at high frequency. The High Viscosity Inkjet Printing machine is also capable of printing multi-materials simultaneously and also enables the mixing and grading of materials in any combination that is desired. This will enable the manufacturing of products with two or more materials that are graded and there will be no distinct boundary between the materials. This will result in products with unique mechanical properties.

Dr. Michiel Willemse who is leading the project says, "The process is unique in its capability to print highly viscous, UV curable, resins. Material formulations with viscosities up to 500 mPa•s (at ambient temperature) have been printed successfully. This offers the opportunity to print products with unequaled mechanical properties when compared to any other printing systems."

- The Plastic Powder Printing Process developed by The Monfort University in the United Kingdom is based on the concept of fusing layers of a wide range of plastic powders in the desired combination by laser printing. PPP aims to develop the equivalent of a high speed laser printer that produces three-dimensional 3D objects from plastic powder where powder is first deposited by means of laser printing /electrophotography technique and subsequently fused under infrared heating units to make solid layers. Layers are consolidated further to make 3D plastic objects. Various thermoplastic toners from standard engineering polymers like polyethylene (high and low density), polypropylene, and polystyrene have already been deposited using this technique and later fused with infrared rays to form the layers.

== See also ==
- Bespoke
- Mass customization
- Personalization
- Configurator
- Personalized marketing
- Product differentiation
- Product management
- Rapid manufacturing
