= Personalized marketing =

Marketing strategy using data analysis to deliver individualized messages and products

Personalized marketing, also known as one-to-one marketing or individual marketing, is a marketing strategy by which companies use data analysis and digital technology to show adverts to individuals based on their perceived characteristics and interests. Marketers use methods from data collection, analytics, digital electronics, and digital economics then use technology to analyze it and show personalized ads based on algorithms that attempt to deduce people’s interests. There are three different types of personalization: individual level personalization, social-level personalization and situation-based personalization. It seems like a good move for companies, however it gets harder as consumers are more afraid of the safety of their privacy.

== Technology ==
Personalized marketing is dependent on many different types of technology for data collection, data classification, data analysis, data transfer, and data scalability. Technology enables marketing professionals to collect first-party data such as gender, age group, location, and income, as well as connect them with third-party data such as click-through rates of online banner ads and social media participation.

Data Management Platforms: A data management platform (DMP) is a centralized computing system for collecting, integrating and managing large sets of structured and unstructured data from disparate sources. Personalized marketing enabled by DMPs is sold to advertisers with the goal of having consumers receive relevant, timely, engaging, and personalized messaging and advertisements that resonate with their unique needs and wants. Growing number of DMP software options are available including Adobe Systems Audience Manager and Core Audience (Marketing Cloud) to Oracle-acquired BlueKai, Sitecore Experience Platform and X+1 Customer Relationship Management Platforms: Customer relationship management (CRM) is used by companies to manage and analyze customer interactions and data throughout the customer lifecycle, improving relationships, boosting retention, and driving sales growth. CRM systems are designed to compile information on customers across different channels (points of contact between the customer and the company) which could include the company's website, live support, direct mail, marketing materials and social media. CRM systems can also give customer-facing staff detailed information on customers' personal information, purchase history, buying preferences and concerns. Most popular enterprise CRM applications are Salesforce.com, Microsoft Dynamics CRM, NetSuite, Hubspot, and Oracle Eloqua.

Beacon Technology: Beacon technology works on Bluetooth low energy (BLE) which is used by a low frequency chip that is found in devices like mobile phones. These chips communicate with multiple Beacon devices to form a network and are used by marketers to better personalize the messaging and mobile ads based on the customer's proximity to their retail outlet. Beacon technology circumference has shrunk, ultimately facilitating its use.

Active vs. passive learning: Active learning means engaging directly with the customer, while passive learning says that marketers need to analyze the actions from customers that are indirectly conntected to personalization.

== Strategies ==
One-to-one marketing refers to marketing strategies applied directly to a specific consumer. Having knowledge of the consumer's preferences, enables suggesting specific products and promotions to each consumer. One-to-one marketing is based on four main steps in order to fulfill its goals: identify, differentiate, interact, and customize.

1. Identify: The focus is on getting to know the customers of a company, to collect reliable data about their preferences and how their needs can best be satisfied. Knowing a consumer's behaviors and habits allows a company to properly target them.
2. Differentiate: Involves distinguishing the customers in terms of their lifetime value to the company, knowing them by their priorities in terms of their needs, and segmenting them into more restricted groups. Ultimately, differentiating customers will help create a strategy targeted to those specific groups.
3. Interact: One needs to know by which communication channel and by what means, contact with the client is best made. It is necessary to get the customer's attention by engaging with him/her in ways that are known as being the ones that he/she enjoys the most. It is important to maintain an ongoing conversation when interacting with consumers, regardless of the time intervals in between.
4. Customize: One needs to personalize the product or service to the customer individually. The knowledge that a company has about a customer, needs to be put into practice and the information held has to be taken into account in order to be able to give the client exactly what he/she wants.

== Goals ==
The goal of personalized marketing includes improving the customer experience by delivering customized interactions and offers, ultimately leading to increased customer loyalty. By understanding individualized consumer needs, a brand can create personalized ads and products that effectively target their desired consumers, fostering satisfaction. Personalized marketing aims to create consumer satisfaction, driving brand loyalty and repeat business.

== Costs and Benefits ==
Personalized marketing is used by businesses to engage in personalized pricing which is a form of price discrimination. Personalized marketing is being adopted in one form or another by many different companies because of the benefits it brings for both the businesses and their customers.

Described below are the costs and benefits of personalized marketing for businesses and customers:

=== Businesses ===
Prior to the Internet, businesses faced challenges in measuring the success of their marketing campaigns. A campaign would be launched, and even if there was a change in revenue, it was often challenging to determine what impact the campaign had on the change. Personalized marketing allows businesses to learn more about customers based on demographic, contextual, and behavioral data. This behavioral data, as well as being able to track consumers’ habits, allows firms to better determine what advertising campaigns and marketing efforts are bringing customers in and what demographics they are influencing. This allows firms to drop efforts that are ineffective, as well as put more money into the techniques that are bringing in customers.

Some personalized marketing can also be automated, increasing the efficiency of a business's marketing strategy. For example, an automated email could be sent to a user shortly after an order is placed, giving suggestions for similar items or accessories that may help the customer better use the product he or she ordered, or a mobile app could send a notification about relevant deals to a customer when he or she is close to a store. Also important in this relation is the use of gen AI to gain more targeted promotions and to reach groups better.

=== Customers ===
Personalized marketing helps to bridge the gap between the vastness of what is available and the needs of customers for streamlined shopping experience. By providing a customized experience for customers, frustrations of purchase choices may be avoided. Customers may be able to find what they are looking for more efficiently, reducing the time spent searching through unrelated content and products. Consumers have become accustomed to this type of user experience that caters to their interests, and companies that have created ultra-customized digital experiences, such as Amazon and Netflix. For customers personalization is helpful in their decision process and their feelings about a product. However they are thinking more about their personal data.

== Future of Personalized Marketing ==
Personalized marketing is becoming even more relevant with the emergence of relevant and supportive technologies like Data Management Platform, geotargeting, and various forms of social media. It will likely be used in future of marketing strategies in competitive markets.

Adapt to technology: Companies must adapt to relevant technologies in order for personalized marketing to be implemented. They may need to familiarize themselves with forms of social media, data-gathering platforms, and other technologies. Companies have access to machine learning, big data and AI that automate personalization processes.

Restructuring current business models: Time and resources are necessary to adopt new marketing systems tailored to the most relevant technologies. Organized planning, communication and restructuring within businesses are essential to successfully implement personalized marketing. Personalized marketing prompts businesses to consider customer data and relevant outside information. Company databases are filled with expansive personal information, such as individuals' geographic locations and potential buyers’ past purchases, which raises concerns about how that information is gathered, circulated internally and externally, and used to increase profits.

Legal liabilities: To address concerns about sensitive information being gathered and utilized without obvious consumer consent, liabilities and legalities have to be set and enforced. To prevent any privacy issues, companies manage legal hurdles before personalized marketing is adopted. Specifically, the EU has passed rigid regulation, known as GDPR, that limits what kind of data marketers can collect on their users, and provide ways in which consumers can suit companies for violation of their privacy. In the US, California has followed suit and passed the CCPA in 2018.

== Controversies ==
=== Use of algorithms ===
Algorithms generate data by analyzing and associating it with user preferences, such as browsing history and personal profiles. Rather than discovering new facts or perspectives, one will be presented with similar or adjoining concepts ("filter bubble"). Some consider this exploitation of existing ideas rather than discovery of new ones. Presenting someone with only personalized content may also exclude other, unrelated news or information that might in fact be useful to the user.

Algorithms may also be flawed. In February 2015, Coca-Cola ran into trouble over an automated, algorithm-generated bot created for advertising purposes. Gawker’s editorial labs director, Adam Pash, created a Twitter bot @MeinCoke and set it up to tweet lines from Mein Kampf and then link to them with Coca-Cola’s campaign #MakeItHappy. This resulted in Coca-Cola’s Twitter feed broadcasting big chunks of Adolf Hitler’s text. In November 2014, the New England Patriots were forced to apologize after an automatic, algorithm-generated bot was tricked into tweeting a racial slur from the official team account.

=== Personalization-Privacy Paradox ===
Getting to know a customer means learning about his behaviors, preferences and the taste through analyzing data. Businesses can use these informations to tailor their ads, benefits and trends towards the needs of the consumer. This might higher the purchase intention, satisfaction and the relationship to the customer. However privacy also becomes also more and more important. More people are afraid about a potential privacy breach and are willing to do more to protect it. The use of personalization is not that easy as assumed. It can go both ways as consumer see it as too much insights into the own life or as useful for their daily life. Because of that it is important to build trust. This tension is called the "personalization-privacy paradox".

== Internet marketing ==
Personalized marketing has proven most effective in interactive media, particularly on the internet. A website has the ability to track a customer's interests and make suggestions based on the collected data. Many sites help customers make choices by organizing information and prioritizing it based on the individual's liking. In some cases, the product itself can be customized using a configuration system.

The business movement during Web 1.0 leveraged database technology for targeting products, ads, and services to specific users with particular profile attributes. The concept was supported by technologies such as BroadVision, ATG, and BEA. Amazon is a classic example of a company that performs "One to One Marketing" by offering users targeted offers and related products.

== Other marketing ==
The term "one-to-one marketing" refers to personalized marketing behavior towards an individual based on received data. Due to its nature, "one-to-one marketing" is often referred to as relationship marketing. This type of marketing creates a personalized relationships with individual consumers.

== Difficulties ==
McKinsey identified 4 problems that prevent companies from implementing large scale personalizations:

- Companies collect and store data but often fail to synchronize and analyze the correct data at the right time.
- Marketers are looking for external motives for personalization, such as holidays, while personalized marketing works best when it is based on triggers - i.e. customers' own behavior.
- Personalized marketing works best in agile companies where there's cross-department collaboration. Most companies are used to hierarchal, strict structures that prevents data sharing across companies.
- Using inadequate technology results in the implementation of ineffective solutions.

== See also ==
- Behavioral targeting
- CCPA
- Configurator
- Datafication
- Digital marketing
- GDPR
- Hypertargeting
- Internet manipulation
- Internet marketing
- Mass customization
- Management information system
- Personal branding
- Real-time bidding
- Real-time data
- Real-time marketing
- Recommender system
- Relationship marketing
- Reputation system
- Surveillance capitalism
- Targeted advertising
- Variable data printing
- Variable pricing
- Behavioral targeting
- Customer experience
- Marketing automation
