= CLM =

CLM may refer to:

== Business ==
- CLM, appointed by the UK Olympic Delivery Authority to build the Olympic Park
- CLM Entertainment, Colin Lester's talent management firm
- Configuration lifecycle management, of a product
- Contract lifecycle management
- Customer lifecycle management, a performance measure
- Closed-loop manufacturing
- Canadian Line Materials, a Civil Defense Siren manufacturer

== Science, technology and medicine ==
- Channel length modulation
- Committee on Copyright and other Legal Matters, a strategic programme of the International Federation of Library Associations and Institutions
- Common Lisp Music, a "music synthesis and signal processing package in the Music V family"
- Conservation of linear momentum
- Cutaneous larva migrans, a form of tropically acquired dermatosis, also known as creeping eruption, plumber's itch, or sandworm disease

== Transport ==
- Collingham railway station, England, by National Rail station code
- William R. Fairchild International Airport, in Port Angeles, Washington, United States, by IATA airport code

== Other uses ==
- Castilla–La Mancha, an autonomous community of Spain
- Christian Life Movement, a lay ecclesial movement of the Catholic Church
- Colombia, ITU country code
- Codex latinus monacensis, the holdings of Latin manuscripts in the Bayerische Staatsbibliothek in Munich
- Collective Labor Movement, a trade union centre in the Philippines
- Contre la Montre, the French term for an individual time trial in road bicycle racing
- CLM P1/01, a Le Mans Prototype racing car
