= Pros =

PROS or Pros may refer to:

- "Pros and Cons", a method of Decision making
- PROS (company), a big data software company
- Republican Party of the Social Order, Brazilian political party, Portuguese name: Partido Republicano da Ordem Social
- PROS (PIK3CA-related overgrowth spectrum), a form of tissue overgrowth

== See also ==
- Pro (disambiguation)
