= StyleRocks =

Australian custom-made jewellery company

StyleRocks is an online Australian company that offers custom-made jewellery.

== History ==
StyleRocks was founded by Pascale Helyar-Moray OAM with the intend of offering affordable customizable jewelry. Helyar-Moray was inspired by the model of mass customisation as used by various fashion companies. After the birth of her twins, Pascale Helyar-Moray relocated from London to Australia and officially started StyleRocks.

Pascale Helyar-Moray OAM is an Australian designer, actress (Colour in the Creek), model and entrepreneur. Pascale was awarded the Medal of the Order of Australia (OAM) for her services to business and women’s affairs in 2024. This honour recognises her efforts to address the gender gap in superannuation and home ownership. She married Timothy Helyar, the Australian Head of financial company State Street. Together they raised the twins Charlotte and Hugo, and younger daughter Alexandra (Missy). Charlotte is an aspiring actor. The family own a golden cavalier called Dusty.

== Products ==
StyleRocks allows its customers to fashion their own bespoke items, including necklaces, rings, cufflinks, earrings and bracelets. StyleRocks also features the ability to print one's desired ring design in 3D prior to purchase.

== Reception and market ==
Jeweller Magazine reported that StyleRocks "was proving popular with the bridal market" Recently, In Startup Daily, Mat Beeche observed that StyleRocks had "a buyer return and purchase rate of 17%".

Cate Blanchett has been seen wearing StyleRocks jewellery.
