= DealHub =

Business software company

- Type: Private
- Industry: SaaS
- Founded: 2014
- Founder: Eyal Elbahary; Eyal Orgil; Alon Lubin
- Headquarters: Austin, Texas, U.S.; Tel Aviv, Israel
- Area served: Worldwide
- Number of employees: 250 (2025)

DealHub (stylized as DealHub.io) develops an agentic quote-to-revenue platform designed to support go-to-market models. The platform combines AI-powered CPQ, DealRoom, and both subscription-based and usage-based billing within a single system.

== History ==
DealHub was founded under the name Valooto in 2014 by Eyal Elbahary, Eyal Orgil and Alon Lubin to provide a modern CPQ platform. At its founding, Valooto described itself as a SaaS platform for sales-engagement and real-time buyer collaboration, designed to support digital sales and remote-selling environments.

In December 2017, the company raised a $3M Series A round, led by Cornerstone Venture Partners with participation from Shaked Ventures, to accelerate revenue growth through enhanced B2B customer engagement and sales execution. In 2018, Aragon Research referred to the company as DealHub.io (formerly Valooto), indicating that it had rebranded. In June 2021, DealHub raised $20M Series B led by Israel Growth Partners with participation from Cornerstone Venture Partners to accelerate international growth. In March 2022, DealHub announced a native integration with HubSpot CRM.

In June 2022 DealHub closed a $60 million at Series C funding round led by Alpha Wave Global (part of a round that brought total disclosed funding to roughly $90 million). In September 2023, its CPQ product became available in the Microsoft Azure Marketplace. In September 2025, it signed a partnership with Crowe LLP, a public accounting and consulting firm, to enhance Quote-to-Revenue operations for Salesforce CRM customers. In November 2025, DealHub announced it had acquired Subskribe, a subscription management and billing platform.

In January 2026, DealHub raised $100 million in growth funding led by Riverwood Capital.

=== Rankings ===
In October 2024, DealHub was included in HubSpot's “Essential Apps for Sales 2024” list.

On December 16, 2024, the company was named Frost & Sullivan’s 2024 North America Company of the Year in the CPQ category.

== Products ==
DealHub's platform unifies Configure Price Quote (CPQ), Subscription Management, Billing, Revenue Recognition, and buyer-facing DealRoom within a single sales and revenue operations platform. It integrates with major customer relationship management (CRM) systems, including Salesforce, Microsoft Dynamics 365, and HubSpot.
