= Sponsored post =

Form of online promotion

Sponsored post, also known as a promoted post, is a post to any community-driven notification-oriented website which is explicitly sponsored as an advertisement by a particular company in order to draw a large amount of popularity through user promotion and moderation to the most active or most viewed page on the website. The model has become adopted by various ad-supported but community-driven websites as an addition, substitute or replacement of other pay-per-click advertisement formats, such as web banners, text and rich media. Sites and services which utilize sponsored posts include Digg, Reddit, Twitter, and Instagram.

Specifically referring to context of blogs, "sponsored posts" were defined by Mutum and Wang (2010) as "promoted blog entries or posts that contain links that point to the home page or specific product pages of the website of the sponsor for which the blogger receives compensation in the form of money, products, services or in other ways". They are also known as paid posts or sponsored reviews.

Sponsored posts can also serve as a means of curtailing the possibility of companies paying individuals to moderate a submitted link or media to the front page of the website, which often violates the spirit or letter of a site's Terms of Service.

== Instagram ==
Instagram Sponsored Posts, also known as "Influencer Marketing" in Instagram is a form of promoting a brand or product through popular celebrities or influential people. Particularly in Instagram, accounts with a lot of followers accept payments to have other people's contents featured on their page for the sake of promotion to a larger audience. Sponsored post prices of the top influencers on instagram can command 6-figure fees, with some reaching millions for a single post. This method of advertising became very popular but was done in private through direct transactions rather than through a legitimized medium like Instagram where it can be legally documented. As such the content being marketed is not being regulated very well. The Federal Trade Commission sent over 90 letters to influencers that they need to properly disclose that they are being sponsored by a brand or product.

Instagram is currently seeking to change the transparency of this method of advertising by launching a new feature. Upon the submission of a sponsored post, there will be a visible tag at the top reading “Paid Partnership With Sponsor Name”. This will allow for more transparency regarding brand sponsorships on the platform.

After reports began circulating that Instagram shows posts to only a small percentage of users' followers, Instagram released a statement denying it is doing any such thing.

== See also ==
- Advertorial
- Gray propaganda
- Hypertargeting
- Native advertising
