= SignalDemand =

- Industry: Price optimization Food industry
- Founded: 2004; 22 years ago
- Founder: Michael R. Neal
- Defunct: 2013; 13 years ago
- Fate: Acquired by PROS
- Headquarters: San Francisco, California

SignalDemand was a provider of price optimization software for large food manufacturers. It was founded in 2004 by Michael R. Neal and was based in San Francisco with its European headquarters in London. SignalDemand delivered solutions as a software as a service (SaaS). In 2013, the company was acquired by PROS.

Customers included major meat and food producers such as Fonterra, Conagra, and Hormel.

Investors included Interwest Partners, Hummer Winblad Venture Partners, General Catalyst Partners, and Catamount Ventures.

In December 2013, PROS acquired the company for $13.5 million.
