= Price walking =

Form of price discrimination

Price walking, or the loyalty penalty, is a form of price discrimination whereby longstanding, loyal customers of a service provider are charged higher prices for the same services compared to customers that have just switched to that provider.

The pricing strategy is common in the insurance and telecommunications industries. It is used to acquire new customers with artificially low rates or other incentives not available to existing clients, effectively using existing customers to subsidize the prices offered to new clients.

== UK ==
In the UK, the Financial Conduct Authority (FCA) has banned the practice for insurance policies effective 2021. The move comes following a complaint by charitable organisation Citizens Advice, which described the practice as a "systemic scam". The FCA stated that "[i]nsurers will be required to offer renewing customers a price that is no higher than they would pay as a new customer."

In 2019, Ofcom announced agreements with several UK telecom providers to ensure out-of-contract customers could get the same deals for broadband service as are available for new customers, if they agree to a new service contract.

== United States ==
In the United States, several northeastern states including Maine, Pennsylvania, Rhode Island, and Vermont have restricted the use of price optimization strategies that employ loyalty penalties in the insurance market.
