= Digital prototyping =

Designing products with digital device

Digital Prototyping gives conceptual design, engineering, manufacturing, and sales and marketing departments the ability to virtually explore a complete product before it's built. Industrial designers, manufacturers, and engineers use Digital Prototyping to design, iterate, optimize, validate, and visualize their products digitally throughout the product development process. Innovative digital prototypes can be created via CAutoD through intelligent and near-optimal iterations, meeting multiple design objectives (such as maximised output, energy efficiency, highest speed and cost-effectiveness), identifying multiple figures of merit, and reducing development gearing and time-to-market. Marketers also use Digital Prototyping to create photorealistic renderings and animations of products prior to manufacturing. Companies often adopt Digital Prototyping with the goal of improving communication between product development stakeholders, getting products to market faster, and facilitating product innovation.

Digital Prototyping goes beyond simply creating product designs in 3D. It gives product development teams a way to assess the operation of moving parts, to determine whether or not the product will fail, and see how the various product components interact with subsystems—either pneumatic or electric. By simulating and validating the real-world performance of a product design digitally, manufacturers often can reduce the number of physical prototypes they need to create before a product can be manufactured, reducing the cost and time needed for physical prototyping. Many companies use Digital Prototyping in place of, or as a complement to, physical prototyping.

Digital Prototyping changes the traditional product development cycle from design>build>test>fix to design>analyze>test>build. Instead of needing to build multiple physical prototypes and then testing them to see if they'll work, companies can conduct testing digitally throughout the process by using Digital Prototyping, reducing the number of physical prototypes needed to validate the design. Studies show that by using Digital Prototyping to catch design problems up front, manufacturers experience fewer change orders downstream. Because the geometry in digital prototypes is highly accurate, companies can check interferences to avoid assembly issues that generate change orders in the testing and manufacturing phases of development. Companies can also perform simulations in early stages of the product development cycle, so they avoid failure modes during testing or manufacturing phases. With a Digital Prototyping approach, companies can digitally test a broader range of their product's performance. They can also test design iterations quickly to assess whether they're over- or under-designing components.

Research from the Aberdeen Group shows that manufacturers that use Digital Prototyping build half the number of physical prototypes as the average manufacturer, get to market 58 days faster than average, and experience 48 percent lower prototyping costs.

== History of Digital Prototyping ==
The concept of Digital Prototyping has been around for over a decade, particularly since software companies such as Autodesk, PTC, Siemens PLM (formerly UGS), and Dassault began offering computer-aided design (CAD) software capable of creating accurate 3D models.

It may even be argued that the product lifecycle management (PLM) approach was the harbinger of Digital Prototyping. PLM is an integrated, information-driven approach to a product's lifecycle, from development to disposal. A major aspect of PLM is coordinating and managing product data among all software, suppliers, and team members involved in the product's lifecycle. Companies use a collection of software tools and methods to integrate people, data, and processes to support singular steps in the product's lifecycle or to manage the product's lifecycle from beginning to end. PLM often includes product visualization to facilitate collaboration and understanding among the internal and external teams that participate in some aspect of a product's lifecycle.

While the concept of Digital Prototyping has been a longstanding goal for manufacturing companies for some time, it's only recently that Digital Prototyping has become a reality for small-to-midsize manufacturers that cannot afford to implement complex and expensive PLM solutions.

== Digital Prototyping and PLM ==
Large manufacturing companies rely on PLM to link otherwise unconnected, siloed activities, such as concept development, design, engineering, manufacturing, sales, and marketing. PLM is a fully integrated approach to product development that requires investments in application software, implementation, and integration with enterprise resource planning (ERP) systems, as well as end-user training and a sophisticated IT staff to manage the technology. PLM solutions are highly customized and complex to implement, often requiring a complete replacement of existing technology. Because of the high expense and IT expertise required to purchase, deploy, and run a PLM solution, many small-to-midsized manufacturers cannot implement PLM.

Digital Prototyping is a viable alternative to PLM for these small-to-midsized manufacturers. Like PLM, Digital Prototyping seeks to link otherwise unconnected, siloed activities, such as concept development, design, engineering, manufacturing, sales, and marketing. However, unlike PLM, Digital Prototyping does not support the entire product development process from conception to disposal, but rather focuses on the design-to-manufacture portion of the process. The realm of Digital Prototyping ends when the digital product and the engineering bill of materials are complete. Digital Prototyping aims to resolve many of the same issues as PLM without involving a highly customized, all-encompassing software deployment. With Digital Prototyping, a company may choose to address one need at a time, making the approach more pervasive as its business grows. Other differences between Digital Prototyping and PLM include:

- Digital Prototyping involves fewer participants than PLM.
- Digital Prototyping has a less complex process for collecting, managing, and sharing data.
- Manufacturers can keep product development activities separate from operations management with Digital Prototyping.
- Digital Prototyping solutions don't need to be integrated with ERP (but can be), customer relationship management (CRM), and project and portfolio management (PPM) software.

== Digital Prototyping Workflow ==
A Digital Prototyping workflow involves using a single digital model throughout the design process to bridge the gaps that typically exist between workgroups such as industrial design, engineering, manufacturing, sales, and marketing. Product development can be broken into the following general phases at most manufacturing companies:

- Conceptual Design
- Engineering
- Manufacturing
- Customer Involvement
- Marketing Communications

=== Conceptual Design ===
The conceptual design phase involves taking customer input or market requirements and data to create a product design. In a Digital Prototyping workflow, designers work digitally, from the very first sketch, throughout the conceptual design phase. They capture their designs digitally, and then share that data with the engineering team using a common file format. The industrial design data is then incorporated into the digital prototype to ensure technical feasibility.

In a Digital Prototyping workflow, designers and their teams review digital design data via high-quality digital imagery or renderings to make informed product design decisions. Designers may create and visualize several iterations of design, changing things like materials or color schemes, before a concept is finalized.

=== Engineering ===
During the engineering phase of the Digital Prototyping workflow, engineers create the product's 3D model (the digital prototype), integrating design data developed during the conceptual design phase. Teams also add electrical systems design data to the digital prototype while it's being developed, and evaluate how different systems interact. At this stage of the workflow, all data related to the product's development is fully integrated into the digital prototype. Working with mechanical, electrical, and industrial design data, companies engineer every last product detail in the engineering phase of the workflow. At this point, the digital prototype is a fully realistic digital model of the complete product.

Engineers test and validate the digital prototype throughout their design process to make the best possible design decisions and avoid costly mistakes. Using the digital prototype, engineers can:

- Perform integrated calculations, and stress, deflection, and motion simulations to validate designs
- Test how moving parts will work and interact
- Evaluate different solutions to motion problems
- Test how the design functions under real-world constraints
- Conduct stress analysis to analyze material selection and displacement
- Verify the strength of a part

By incorporating integrated calculations, stress, deflection, and motion simulations into the Digital Prototyping workflow, companies can speed development cycles by minimizing physical prototyping phases. By implementing a digital prototype of a partially or fully automated vehicle and its sensor suite into a dynamic co-simulation of traffic flow and vehicle dynamics, a novel toolchain methodology comprising virtual testing is available for the development of automated driving functions by the automotive industry.

Also during the engineering phase of the Digital Prototyping workflow, engineers create documentation required by the production team.

=== Manufacturing ===
In a Digital Prototyping workflow, manufacturing teams are involved early in the design process. This input helps engineers and manufacturing experts work together on the digital prototype throughout the design process to ensure that the product can be produced cost effectively. Manufacturing teams can see the product exactly as it's intended, and provide input on manufacturability. Companies can perform molding simulations on digital prototypes for plastic part and injection molds to test the manufacturability of their designs, identifying potential manufacturing defects before they cut mold tooling.

Digital Prototyping also enables product teams to share detailed assembly instructions digitally with manufacturing teams. While paper assembly drawings can be confusing, 3D visualizations of digital prototypes are unambiguous. This early and clear collaboration between manufacturing and engineering teams helps minimize manufacturing problems on the shop floor.

Finally, manufacturers can use Digital Prototyping to visualize and simulate factory-floor layouts and production lines. They can check for interferences to detect potential issues such as space constraints and equipment collisions.

=== Customer Involvement ===
Customers are involved throughout the Digital Prototyping workflow. Rather than waiting for a physical prototype to be complete, companies that use Digital Prototyping bring customers into the product development process early. They show customers realistic renderings and animations of the product's digital prototype so they'll know what the product looks like and how it will function. This early customer involvement helps companies get sign-off up front, so they don't waste time designing, engineering, and manufacturing a product that doesn't fulfill the customer's expectations.

=== Marketing ===
Using 3D CAD data from the digital prototype, companies can create realistic visualizations, renderings, and animations to market products in print, on the web, in catalogues, or in television commercials. Without needing to produce expensive physical prototypes and conduct photo shoots, companies can create virtual photography and cinematography nearly indistinguishable from reality. One aspect of this is creating the illumination environment for the subject, an area of new development.

Realistic visualizations not only help marketing communications, but the sales process as well. Companies can respond to requests for proposals and bid on projects without building physical prototypes, using visualizations to show the potential customer what the end product will be like. In addition, visualizations can help companies bid more accurately by making it more likely that everyone has the same expectations about the end product. Companies can also use visualizations to facilitate the review process once they've secured the business. Reviewers can interact with digital prototypes in realistic environments, allowing for the validation of design decisions early in the product development process.

=== Connecting Data and Teams ===
To support a Digital Prototyping workflow, companies use data management tools to coordinate all teams at every stage in the workflow, streamline design revisions and automate release processes for digital prototypes, and manage engineering bills of materials. These data management tools connect all workgroups to critical Digital Prototyping data.

== Digital Prototyping and Sustainability ==
Companies increasingly use Digital Prototyping to understand sustainability factors in new product designs, and to help meet customer requirements for sustainable products and processes. They minimize material use by assessing multiple design scenarios to determine the optimal amount and type of material required to meet product specifications. In addition, by reducing the number of physical prototypes required, manufacturers can trim down their material waste.

Digital Prototyping can also help companies reduce the carbon footprint of their products. For example, WinWinD, a company that creates innovative wind turbines, uses Digital Prototyping to optimize the energy production of wind-power turbines for varying wind conditions. Furthermore, the rich product data supplied by Digital Prototyping can help companies demonstrate conformance with the growing number of product-related environmental regulations and voluntary sustainability standards.
