= Bluesmobile =

Fictional car

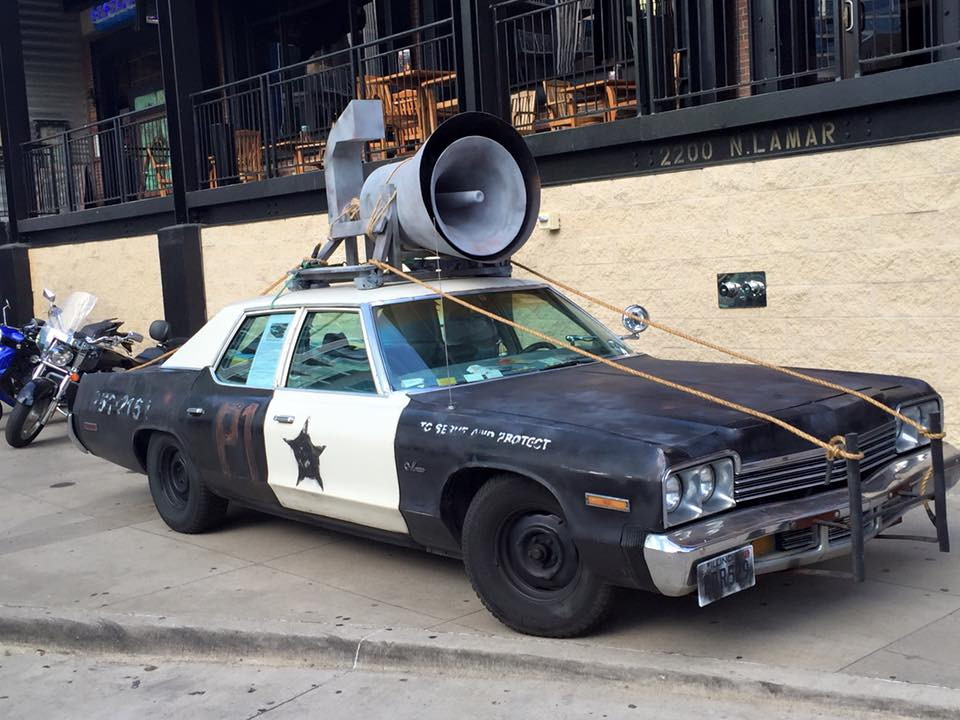
Bluesmobile replica at House of Blues in Dallas, Texas

The Bluesmobile is a 1974 Dodge Monaco sedan that was prominently featured in the 1980 Universal Pictures film The Blues Brothers. The car is described as a decommissioned Mount Prospect police car, purchased by Elwood Blues at an auction after he had traded a previous car (a 1968 Cadillac Sixty Special) for a microphone. The Bluesmobile is equipped with a "440 Magnum" engine and squad car package, an option offered by Dodge for the Monaco in 1974. It bears an Illinois license plate reading "BDR 529", a tribute to the Black Diamond Riders motorcycle club of Toronto, Canada. Dan Aykroyd, co-writer of the film, stated that he chose the 440 Dodge Monaco because he considered it to be the hottest car used by police during the 1970s.

It's got a cop motor, a 440-cubic-inch plant. It's got cop tires, cop suspension, cop shocks. It's a model made before catalytic converters so it'll run good on regular gas.

— Elwood Blues describing the Bluesmobile

The Bluesmobile has the ability to perform seemingly impossible stunts, such as jumping over an open drawbridge, flipping backwards in midair and even "flying" for very brief periods of time. However, its cigarette lighter does not work, and Jake throws it out the window upon finding this out for himself.

== Blues Brothers vehicles ==
No.	Color	Vehicle	Year	License plate
1	Black	Cadillac Fleetwood Sixty Special	1968	SP2 153
2	Black/White	Dodge Monaco	1974	BDR 529
3	Black/White	Ford LTD Crown Victoria LX	1990	BKV 974

== Blues Brothers: Private - 1968 Cadillac Fleetwood ==
According to the book Blues Brothers: Private, published in 1980 and written by Judith Jacklin and Tino Insana to add substance to The Blues Brothers universe, the first Bluesmobile was a 1968 Cadillac Fleetwood Sixty Special license number SP2 153.

== The Blues Brothers - 1974 Dodge Monaco ==
In the opening scene of The Blues Brothers, Elwood arrives at Joliet Prison in the 1974 Dodge Monaco to pick up the newly-released Jake. When Jake asks about their previous Bluesmobile, Elwood tells him he traded it for a microphone. Elwood explains the Dodge Monaco is a decommissioned Mount Prospect police car, which he purchased at a surplus auction the previous spring. After proving its worthiness by jumping it over the 95th St. Bridge in Chicago, Jake approves it as their new Bluesmobile.

=== Cars used in the film production ===
The film used 13 different cars to depict the Bluesmobile, all of which were former police cars purchased from the California Highway Patrol, and were mocked up to look like former Mount Prospect, Illinois patrol cars, which had an identical black and white paint scheme, making the conversion more simple. Some were formatted for speed, and others in jumps or high-performance maneuvers, depending on the scene. One was designed simply to fall apart upon its arrival at the Cook County Building. A mechanic took several months to rig the car for that scene. Over 60 old police cars were purchased for the film's chase scenes, and the production kept a 24-hour body shop open to perform repairs as needed.

At the time of the film's release, it set a world record for the most cars destroyed in one film; it held this distinction until 1998, when it was surpassed by its own sequel.

=== Roof-mounted loudspeaker ===
According to Dan Aykroyd, the horn-shaped loudspeaker atop the Bluesmobile was actually a duplicate of a massive Cold War-era air raid siren (CLM Model 92729DP) installed in the schoolyard at "Our Lady of Annunciation" where Aykroyd attended elementary school while growing up in Ottawa, Canada. The siren was manufactured by a Canadian company called Canadian Line Materials, and Aykroyd specifically requested the same CLM model be used in the movie to portray the loudspeaker the characters affixed to the top of the Bluesmobile and used as a public address system.

=== Chase scenes ===
The Blues Brothers use the Bluesmobile to evade pursuers in a number of high-speed chases throughout the film, culminating in a police pursuit/race to Chicago after the band's performance north of the city. Even though the car throws a connecting rod during this pursuit, they are still able to outrun both the police and a group of Neo-Nazis in a pair of Ford station wagons. After they crash through the Richard J. Daley Center and arrive at the Cook County Building to pay the property taxes on the orphanage where they grew up, the car falls to pieces on the sidewalk.

Director John Landis has claimed that the portion of the final chase sequence beneath the elevated train tracks, which briefly showed a reading of 118 miles per hour (190 km/h) on the car's speedometer, was actually filmed at that speed, a testament to the Monaco's police car heritage. He has also stated that he re-shot some of the scenes with pedestrians on the sidewalks, so viewers could see that the film had not been sped up to create the effect of speed.

The vehicle's model is never referred to in the original film by Elwood, who purchased the car, or the various police officers and dispatch operators coordinating the manhunt. It is only referred to as a "1974 Dodge sedan" over the police two-way radios and as "that shitbox Dodge" by Illinois state trooper Mount, who is (along with his partner) pursuing Jake and Elwood throughout the film.

=== Extended DVD version ===
In the extended version of the film, Elwood is seen parking the Bluesmobile in an electric substation that was used to power Chicago's elevated trains. In the documentary "Stories Behind the Making of the Blues Brothers", Dan Aykroyd suggested that the scene was intended to show the Bluesmobile was getting "power" from the substation, which would help explain how it was able to do impressive stunts. In the original theatrical release, director John Landis had cut that scene to shorten the length of the film. According to Landis, there was no need to explain the car's powers. To him, it was simply "a magic car" and of course, they were on a mission from God. A power station was visible in the background of the film's poster.

== Blues Brothers 2000 - 1990 Ford LTD Crown Victoria ==
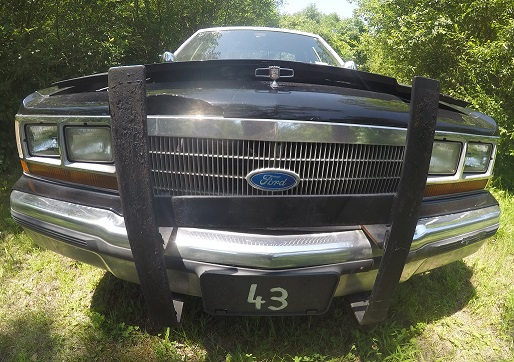
Bluesbrothers 2000 movie set car #43

The name "Bluesmobile" was also given to another former police car, a 1990 Ford LTD Crown Victoria, used in the 1998 sequel, Blues Brothers 2000. In the film, Elwood purchases the car from Malvern Gasperon's yard in Chicago for $500. The car was equipped with a 190 hp 351 cubic inch engine, 4-speed automatic transmission and full optional Police Package including front bullbar, canine cage insert, and Appleton spotlights. Livery is a classic "Black & White" paint theme common to many American police departments; in this case, very similar to the California Highway Patrol's K-9 unit, with "safety and service" motto on the fenders.

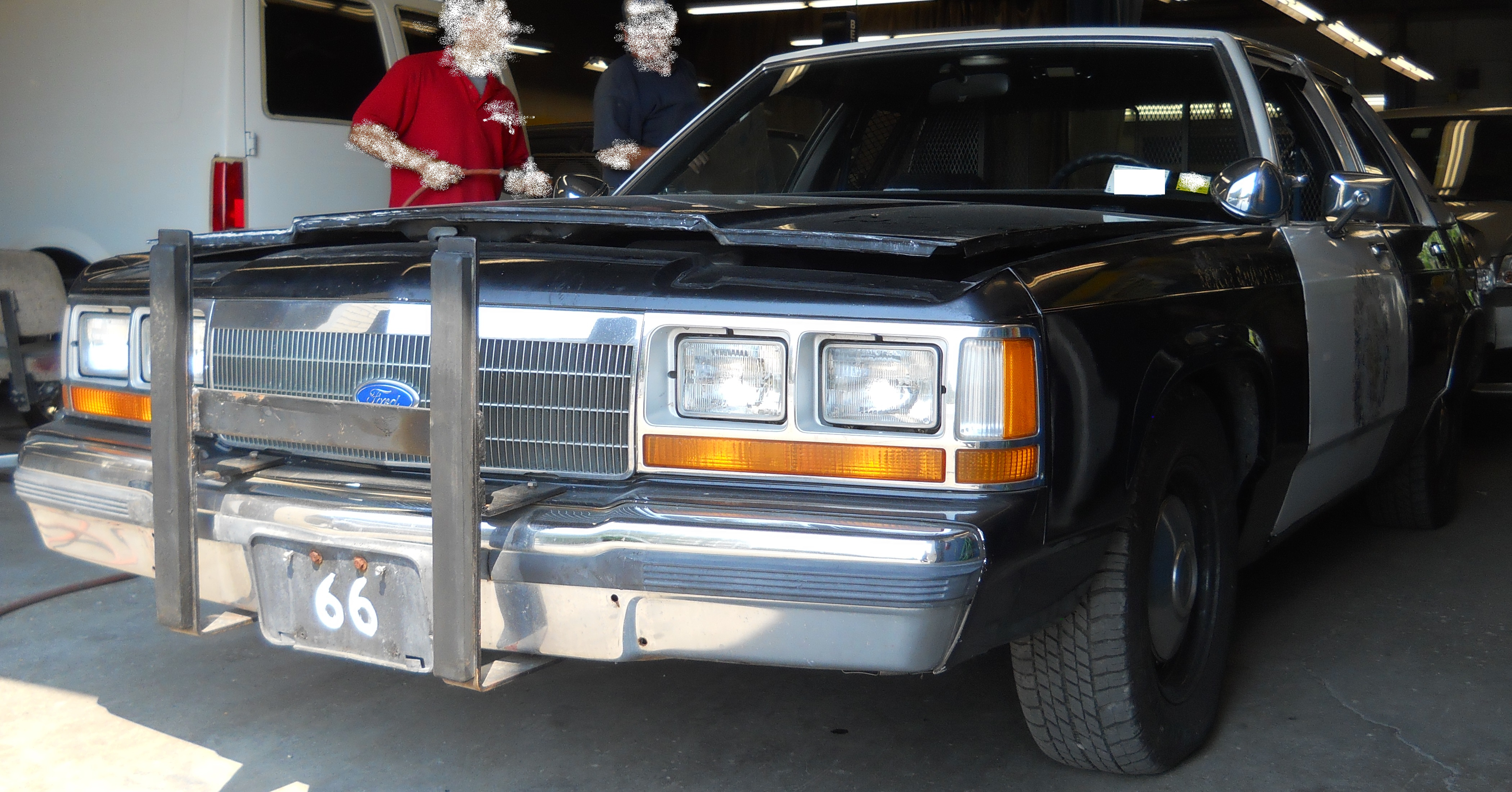
Blues Brothers 2000 movie set car #66

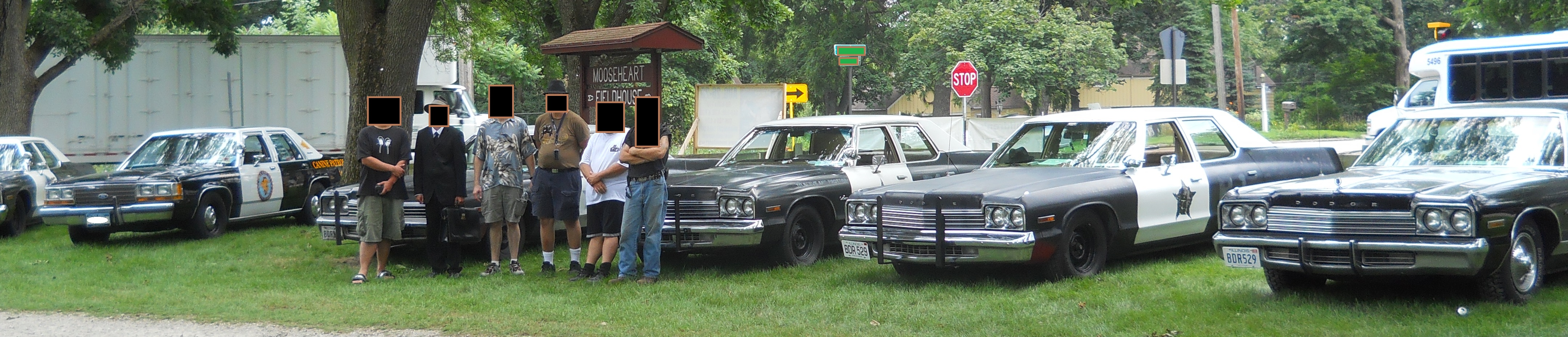
A gathering of bluesmobile replicas including one Ford with five Dodges

=== Chase and crash scenes ===
Blues Brothers 2000 sought to outdo the original by including a number of outrageous stunts. The new Bluesmobile was depicted as having abilities such as functioning like a submarine in deep Mississippi water, having radio-control capabilities, and jumping about 300 feet over a road construction site. The new film claimed the world record for the highest number of cars destroyed at 104, beating the record set by The Blues Brothers. In the film's major crash scene, 63 cars were destroyed. While filming another scene, stuntman Bob Minor suffered serious head injuries and a crew member required a leg amputation after a car rolled on to him.

== Toy models ==
The first Bluesmobile, a 1974 Dodge Monaco, was marketed by various manufacturers in a number of die-cast versions. A die-cast model of the second Bluesmobile, a 1990 Ford LTD Crown Victoria, was marketed by the Johnny Lightning model car brand.
