= Configuration lifecycle management =

Business process

Configuration Lifecycle Management (CLM) is the management of all product configuration definitions and configurations across all involved business processes applied throughout the lifecycle of a product.

The development of the concept of CLM has been prompted by the proliferation of configuration capabilities in different enterprise systems and a subsequent need to establish a master system of records for product definition logic and configurations, especially for manufacturing companies that rely on business processes related to assemble-to-order or mass customization. CLM differs from other business disciplines as it focuses on cross functional use of information of configurable products. This entails that users of CLM include both back-office engineers, financial controllers among others, and marketing, sales and customers.

== Background ==
Systems and technologies for defining and maintaining configuration definitions developed and matured during the 1990s and 2000s and are today established in three different main areas:

- Definition of engineering and construction rules in PLM systems
- Definition of ordering and manufacturing rules in ERP systems
- Definition of pricing, market and sales rules in CPQ-systems

These definitions operate with different domains for configurations expressed in bill of materials adapted for different business purposes, typically E-BOMs in the PLM world, M-BOMs in the ERP world, pricing and sales-BOMs in CRM/CPQ and S-BOMs and procedures in SRM.

The Concept of Configuration Lifecycle Management (CLM) was introduced in 2012 by Joy Batchelor and Henrik Reif Andersen following TATA Motors’ acquisition of the automotive manufacturer Jaguar Land Rover (JLR) and JLR's subsequent search for a future platform to handle configuration of vehicles throughout the enterprise.

Following an evaluation and decision to deploy a new Enterprise Resource Planning system and a Product Lifecycle Management system, both of which have rule authoring and configuration capabilities each developed for different purposes, JLR saw an opportunity to introduce a new rule authoring and configuration management system to avoid unnecessary duplication of configuration activities and subsequent errors due to misaligned configuration rules.

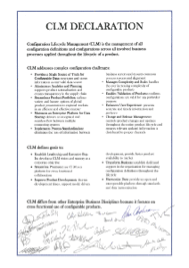
Figure 1: Signed CLM Declaration

The CLM Summit hosted by the company Configit for Automotive and Industrial Machinery in 2015 identified a general need to change the current disconnected way of defining product configuration logic and issued the so-called 2015 CLM Declaration which is a non-scientific paper reflecting a common agreement of the summit participants on CLM.

In 2023, Gartner released a report titled, "Top Strategic Technology Trends in Asset-Intensive Manufacturing for 2023," in which it mentions that by 2026, configuration life cycle management will transform 40% of manufacturers, reducing the amount of customer-specific engineering required to deliver products.

== Challenges addressed by CLM ==
According to the CLM Declaration, CLM should address the following complex configuration challenges:

- Provides a Single Source of Truth for Configurable Data: structures and stores information as one valid data source
- Administers Analytics and Planning: supports product rationalization and creates transparency in the supply chain
- Streamlines Product Portfolios: defines variety and feature options of global product presentation to regional markets in an efficient and effective manner
- Maintains an Enterprise Platform for Data Sharing: delivers an integrated and seamless flow between multiple connecting systems
- Implements Process Standardization: eliminates the loss of information between business sectors and ensures common process success and alignment
- Manages Complexity and Scale: handles the ever-increasing complexity of configurable products
- Enables Validation of Products: confirms configurations are valid for any particular purpose
- Enhances User Experience: presents accurate and timely information and guidance
- Change and Release Management: controls product changes and updates throughout the entire product lifecycle and ensures relevant updated information is distributed to proper channels

== Integration with relating business disciplines and systems ==
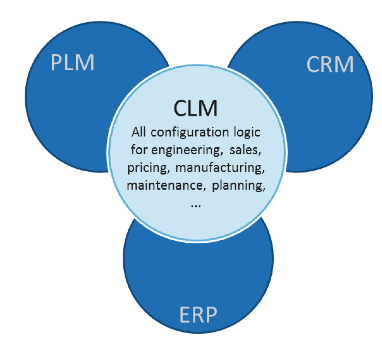
Figure 1. A CLM system is the master system of record for configuration logic thus integrating traditional enterprise systems such as ERP, CRM and PLM.

Without a CLM approach integrating configuration capabilities available in different enterprise systems is problematic due to the differences in configuration paradigms used to solve different types of specific configuration problems. When applying a CLM approach to this challenge a configuration management system that is agnostic to the format of rules from different systems interprets the outcome of these rules and translates, enriches and exports these rules to other systems in the organization.

In the automotive industry a practice has developed over the last 30 years in which aspects of vehicles are modelled using an abstract notion of a feature. A feature is an abstraction used to represent an aspect of a product. It is identified by a feature code and an associated feature description. Features can be commercial features capturing an aspect of relevance to a customer, for instance, the color of the vehicle, whether it is a diesel or petrol engine and whether it has a manual or automatic gearbox. Features can also be technical features of relevance to manufacturing but less so for a customer. Examples are, the frequency to be used for keyless entry, the variant of the exhaust system needed for a particular configuration of the vehicle and the emission standard to be fulfilled by the vehicle.

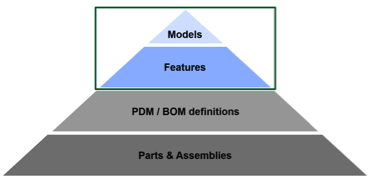
Figure 2. Configuration lifecycle managed through models composed of features that are an abstraction from the physical data layers.

In CLM features are used as an abstraction layer between the CLM-system and subscribing systems. A feature string is a valid (as determined by the definitions in the CLM system) complete or partial selection of features that define a product. The feature string acts as a product's DNA that is shared by all subscribing systems and processes.

Any CLM solution needs a powerful configuration engine to support creation and validation of feature strings. Historically, there are three generations of configuration engines:

1. The first generation of engines were launched back in the late 1970s based on results in Artificial Intelligence going back to the 1960s. These engines are rule-based truth-maintenance systems. They were pioneered in the Digital Equipment Corporation's system R1 (internally known as XCON) which was a production-rule-based system to support the sales configuration of VAX micro-computers. First generation configuration engines are still in use as in for instance SAP's Variant Configuration module in SAP ERP.
2. The second generation of engines flourished in the 1990s. They are constraint solvers using constraint propagation and search techniques developed in the Artificial Intelligence domain. They are the dominant technology still in use commercially. An overview can be found in Knowledge-Based Configuration – From Research to Business Cases.
3. The third generation of engines have arrived after 2000. They use a compiled approach in which the full solution space is represented in a compact format. They were pioneered by Array Technology (a spin-off from Beologic) and Configit.

=== Phases in the Configuration Lifecycle ===
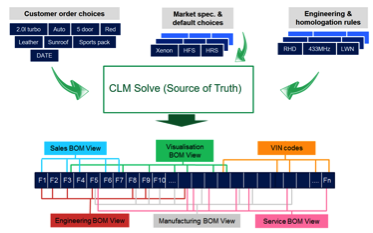
Figure 3. A passenger car example of a CLM platform where market and engineering configuration definitions guides the customer to generate a valid and complete Feature String which then drives subsequent processes.

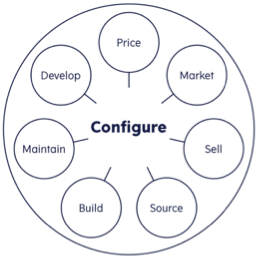
Figure 4. Example of different business processes depending on configuration lifecycle management

Behind the seemingly simple process of configuring and ordering a configurable product, such as a car, lie several business processes of which configuration is an essential part:

==== Develop ====
When developing a new product that is designed to be customized, allowable variants and options must be defined.

==== Price ====
Pricing of customizable products must account for market acceptability and costs based on calculations of all the possible configurations

==== Market ====
Market demands and local regulation are expressed as rules enabling enterprises to meet demands in a global market

==== Sell ====
Customizing to the specific wants and needs of the individual customer resulting in a valid order to be fed into downstream systems

==== Sources ====
Parts and assemblies from sub-suppliers are sourced to fit in the sequence of the assembly line.

==== Build ====
The configuration determines how the product is built. Invalid configurations can cause the production line to stop and erroneous products, placing a huge importance on eliminating errors before this phase.

==== Maintain/Service/Operate ====
The phase of the lifecycle known in e.g. Automotive as aftermarket. In CLM the configuration of the product is updated, elements and components are replaced in a way that ensures that these activities are compliant with the configuration.

==== Dispose ====
Once the product has reached end of life and is to be disposed, depending on the materials used in the product, disposal requirements may apply. These requirements are usually reflected by laws (e.g. REACH). In order to enable disposal of the product in conformance to these disposal requirements, the composition of the product must be documented, available and up to date - i.e. the complete configuration lifecycle information must be available.

== Mass Customization ==
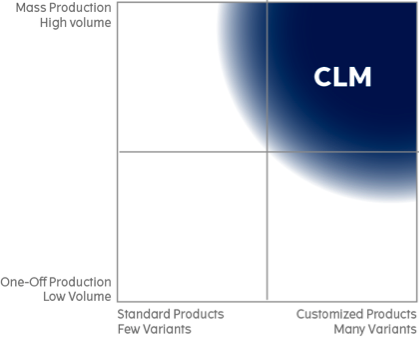
CLM - many variants, high volume

When moving towards mass customization, almost every business process from development, manufacturing through to the delivery of configurable products needs to be adapted to ensure both accuracy and efficiency. The creation of configuration capabilities in today's market means that configuration data is increasingly likely to be distributed across multiple applications throughout an enterprise system. CLM software supplies the needed functionality for a lifecycle approach to product configuration.

== Further development ==
The Configuration Lifecycle Management (CLM) Summit, organized by Configit, is a forum established to further develop CLM as a discipline. The first Inaugural CLM Summit was held in September 2015 at Lake Lanier, Georgia with participants from various industrial and educational organizations. The direct outcome of this summit was the CLM declaration, co-authored and signed by participants of the summit.
