= Observatory of prices =

An observatory of prices tries to improve the knowledge of the explanatory circumstances of the formation of the prices of goods, typically of differences between prices of basic products from source to destination, or in different markets, allowing to carry out a systematic pursuit of the same, and making the prices creation as public as possible. An observatory of prices tries to favor the transparency and rationality in the commercialization of products in free complex markets, contributing to the price stability of products (trying to limit deflation or inflation), increasing the organization and amount of information of the quotes of products, and improving the competition in the different phases from the commercialization process and in the different times and locations, to the benefit of all the intervening agents in the chain, especially of the consumers.

== Spanish Observatory of Price ==
- Canary Island Government Price's Observatory
- Supercomprador Price Observatory
