= Canadian Line Materials =

Siren manufacturing company

Canadian Line Materials LTD. (CLM) was a Canadian siren manufacturing company which built civil defense sirens. It was originally founded as a division of the McGraw-Edison Company

== History ==
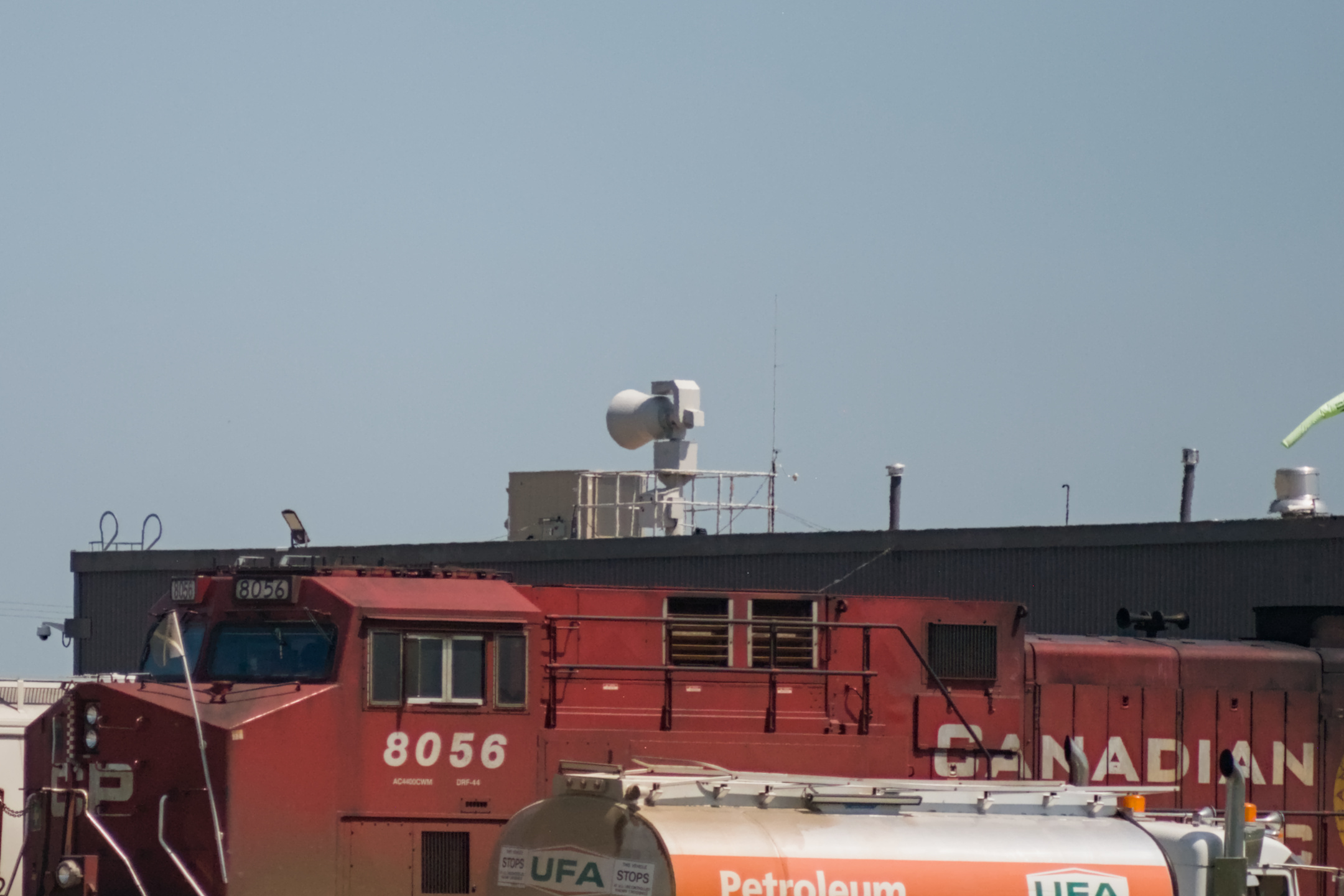
A rooftop-mounted CLM 927xxDP Rotating Siren at CPKC's Kipp Yard in Kipp, AB.

Canadian Line Materials began business in 1925 as a division from McGraw-Edison, and built electrical equipment such as lightning arresters. In around 1940 they made their first sirens, Models 5261 and 5263. The Canadian government contacted CLM asking if they could make civil defense sirens to warn civilians and military about incoming attacks. CLM accepted and began production of their sirens, installing over 1,600 sirens across Canada. In 1985, CLM was sold to Cooper Industries.

== Siren models ==
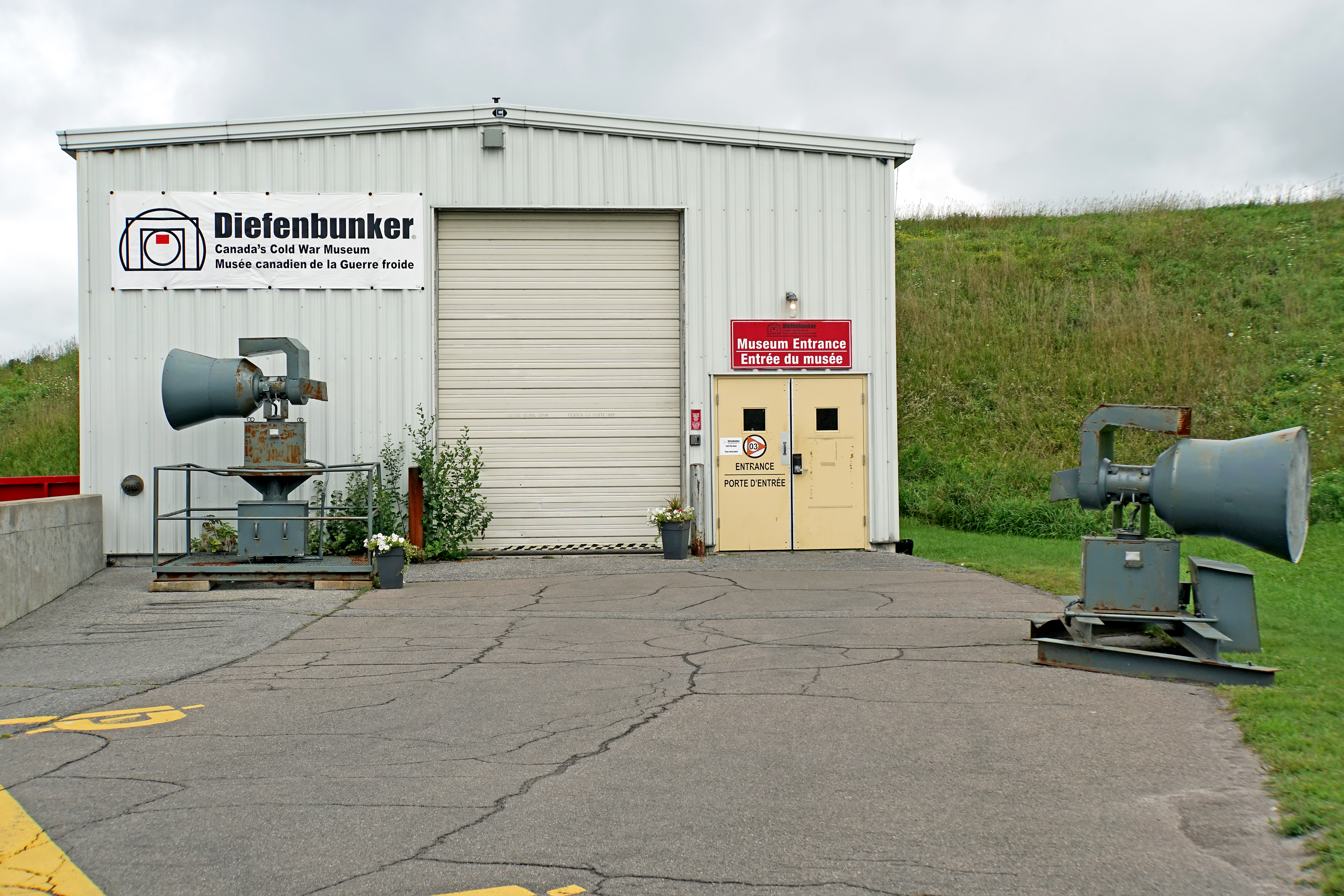
Diefenbunker with two CLM 927XXDP sirens.

The CLM Model 927XXDP siren (rotational CLM) is a 10/12 port rotating electromechanical siren, with a distinctive design featuring two unique horns. The decibel rating of the model is ~130 decibels. These sirens use Lincoln Electric 5 horsepower induction motors. This model of CLM is the most well-known and recognizable warning siren made by CLM. Two models were available, the 220V 92730DP, and the 550V 92729DP.

The CLM "Mailbox" siren series are omni-directional 10/12 or 20/24 port electromechanical sirens with a design similar to the World War II Carter siren. They are housed in mailbox-style housing, which gives the series its name. These sirens use unknown Lincoln Electric motors. Most of these have been decommissioned or removed. Known model numbers of these sirens are the 5563, 5263, 5223, and 5261.

The CLM omni-directional siren, model number 92763CP, is a 10/12 port omnidirectional electromechanical siren of unusual design, with a vertical single rotor design differing from the dual rotor design of CLM's other sirens. According to a document from the siren system in Nelson, British Columbia, which was made up of several of these sirens, the siren was rated at 105 dB at 100 ft. All of these have been decommissioned or removed.

== National distribution of sirens installed ==
List may contain other brands
Province	Number of sirens installed
British Columbia	336
Alberta	122
Saskatchewan	32
Manitoba	75
Ontario	552
National Capital Region	61
Quebec	282
New Brunswick	78
Nova Scotia	92
Prince Edward Island	7
Newfoundland	67
National Total	1704

== In popular culture ==
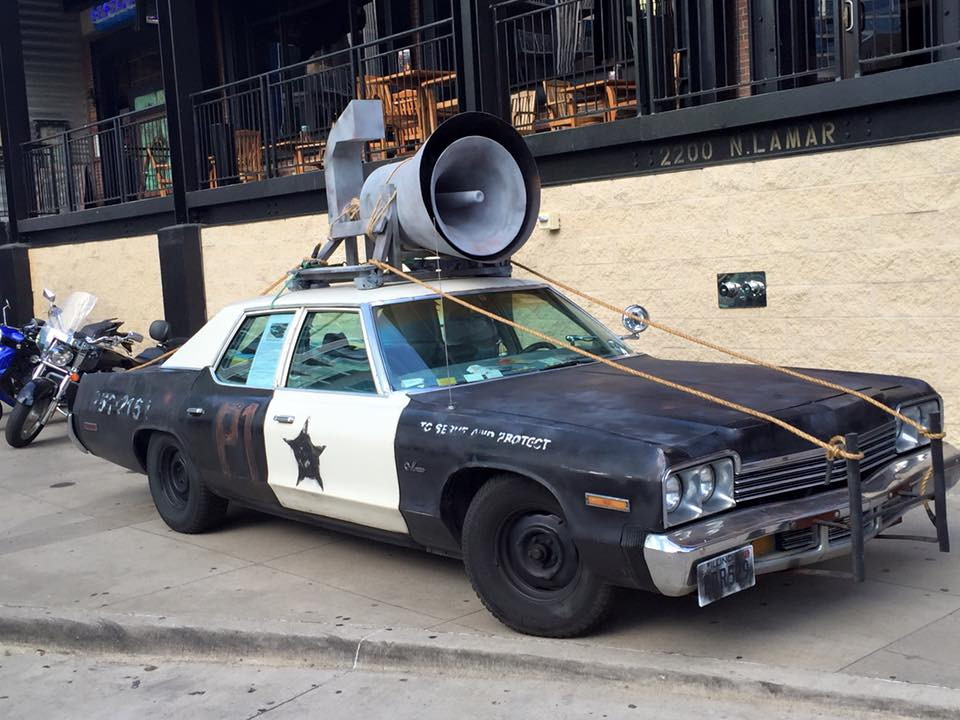
Replica Bluesmobile vehicle with the CLM loudspeaker model.

The siren was a major inspiration behind the rooftop "speaker" on top of the Bluesmobile in the 1980 film The Blues Brothers. The loudspeaker mounted atop the vehicle as a public warning siren was modelled after a CLM Model 92729DP, as specifically requested by the co-writer, Dan Aykroyd. Aykroyd grew up in Ottawa, where many of these sirens were installed, including one outside of the elementary school he attended, which inspired the design used in the film.
