= Price optimization =

Fundamental analysis

Price optimization is the use of mathematical analysis by a company to determine how customers will respond to different prices for its products and services through different channels and is in contrast to market value. It is also used to determine the prices that the company determines will best meet its objectives such as maximizing operating profit. The data used in price optimization can include survey data, operating costs, inventories, and historic prices and sales. Price optimization practice has been implemented in industries including retail, banking, airlines, casinos, hotels, car rental, cruise lines and insurance industries.

== Overview ==
Price optimization utilizes data analysis to predict the behavior of potential buyers to different prices of a product or service. Depending on the type of methodology being implemented, the analysis may leverage survey data (e.g. such as in a conjoint pricing analysis) or raw data (e.g. such as in a behavioral analysis leveraging 'big data'). Companies use price optimization models to determine pricing structures for initial pricing, promotional pricing and discount pricing.

Market simulators are often used to simulate the choices people make to predict how demand varies at different price points. This data can be combined with cost and inventory levels to develop a profitable price point for that product or service. This model is also used to evaluate pricing for different customer segments by simulating how targeted customers will respond to price changes with data-driven scenarios.

Price optimization starts with a segmentation of customers. A seller then estimates how customers in different segments will respond to different prices offered through different channels. Given this information, determining the prices that best meet corporate goals can be formulated and solved as a constrained optimization process. The form of the optimization is determined by the underlying structure of the pricing problem.

If capacity is constrained and perishable and customer willingness-to-pay increases over time, then the underlying problem is classified as a yield management or revenue management problem. If capacity is constrained and perishable and customer willingness-to-pay decreases over time, then the underlying problem is one of markdown management. If capacity is not constrained and prices cannot be tailored to the characteristics of a particular customer, then the problem is one of list-pricing. If prices can be tailored to the characteristics of an arriving customer then the underlying problem is sometimes called customized pricing.

== Price optimization software ==
Price optimization software is an example of business software available to companies to support key business functions. Software companies have developed price optimization software packages to handle complex calculations. Companies have tailored these to meet the needs of B2C organizations, such as retail, or B2B companies, such as those who require more complex quoting. Another common use of pricing software and pricing systems is for companies, both B2C and B2B, with a large number of products/articles sold in a wide range countries using different currencies and with commercial arrangements. Here, the complexity of combinations and permutations is an example of a big data solution where the seller can create central pricing strategies that then can be applied and executed across the organization. A further development of pricing software, especially in B2B companies, is to integrate this with software that configures larger, customized systems and solutions, and then also to integrate this with software that transforms the configuration and resulting price into a customer offer/quotation. The combination of configuration, pricing and quoting solutions is abbreviated to CPQ solutions.

Retailers and CPGs increasingly use AI-driven pricing tools to reduce execution errors, improve loyalty, and better align pricing with demand. These tools can model demand elasticity, run predictive price scenarios, and connect pricing with other key business functions like product data, promotions, and assortment planning.

Manfred Krafft and Murali K. Mantrala discuss the use of price optimization software in the retail industry and the paradigm shift from price optimization to pricing process improvement in their book Retailing in the 21st Century: Current and Future Trends, published in 2006. The book mentions that the research conducted on price optimization by its traditional definition is not applicable to the retail industry, and they recommend retailers adopt a process view of pricing.

== See also ==
- Market value
- Market price
