= PCon.planner =

3D interior design and planning software

pCon.planner
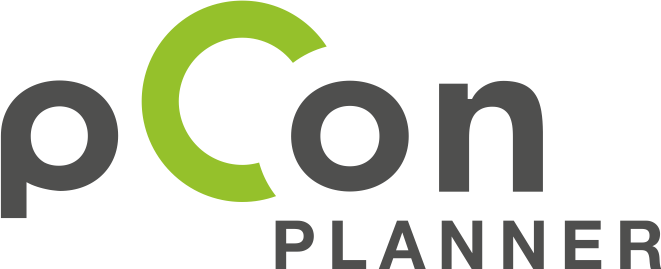
- Developer: EasternGraphics GmbH
- Release: 1998
- Stable release: 8.7 / April 7, 2022; 4 years ago
- Operating system: Windows 8.1/10
- Platform: x64
- Size: 282 MB
- Available in: 14 languages
- List of languages English, German, Spanish, French, Italian, Dutch, Romanian, Portuguese, Russian, Czech, Turkish, Swedish, Danish, Polish
- Type: 3D computer graphics software
- License: Proprietary
- Website: www.pcon-planner.com

pCon.planner is a space planning, graphical product configuration, quotation creation and communication solution for interior designers, furniture manufacturers and facility managers. The application is developed by EasternGraphics GmbH in Ilmenau (Thuringia/Germany). There is a free of charge version, without configuration capabilities as well as cost based versions (ME and PRO).

== History ==
In 1998 the IBA the German association for office and work environment (former BSO) commissioned EasternGraphics to develop OFML (Office Furniture Modeling Language) data specification. The goal was to design a consistent description format for complex products that are characterized by a high number of properties. It was during that time that the technical basis for the creation of pCon.planner were laid. pCon.planner was the first application to be able to process OFML data.

In the following years pCon.planner 4 (February 2004 - February 2007) and 5 (from February 2007 until today) were developed. In 2008, parallel to the work for pCon.planner 5, the company started with the total re-implementation of the planning system using completely new technology and incorporating the feedback of customers gathered during years.

In October 2008, the first beta version of pCon.planner 6 was introduced to the customers at the Orgatec fair in Cologne, Germany. A few weeks later EasternGraphics offered pCon.planner 6.0 as freeware on the Internet.

In October 2014 pCon.planner 7 was introduced, again to the visitors of the Orgatec fair in Cologne. With this release major changes were made to the user interface, implementing a user-focused way of designing. Additionally, the free version of the 3d room planner was strengthened by enriching it with features from the paid versions.

Orgatec in October 2018 was used to introduce pCon.planner 8. This is the first version of the interior design software to use physically based rendering (PBR) and with it a new material model, which, as of fall 2018, is "used in all new pCon applications." The new material model and render method make for more realistic looking objects. Also, a long-awaited batch rendering feature was introduced to the PRO version.

Since 2008 more than 2.7 Million copies of pCon.planner (data from August 2016) have been downloaded.

== Scope of application ==
pCon.planner is a process-oriented application for space planning and interior design. Users can draw rooms and fill them with 3D objects and materials which they can directly download from online catalogs. In addition, the application offers various possibilities for showcasing designs and scenes, such as the creation of images, panoramas or films in a photo-realistic quality.

== Characteristics ==
pCon.planner is a characteristic-based product configurator, and presents the user with several discrete variables (or characteristics) that are used to define the final design or plan. The following specifications apply to the free version of pCon.planner as well as the one to be paid for, unless stated otherwise:

- DWG as native file format
- High performance for complex projects
- Drawing of spaces and single walls
- Room elements (e.g. door, glassfronts, staircase)
- Layer manipulation
- Direct access to a 3D online catalog (pCon.catalog)
- Integration of Trimble 3D Warehouse and conversion to DWG
- Support for different light types (Spot, Area, Directional and Point)
- Creation of animations, Multi Content Pictures and 360° Panoramic Images
- Integration of YafaRay for rendering pictures and videos (64 bit)
- Integration of OSPRay for rendering pictures (64bit)
- Creation of individual Render Styles
- Creation of HDR (High Dynamic Range) images
- Upload of plannings to the Web and showcasing them (as Impress presentation)
- Import/export of various geometry and image file formats (DWG, DXF, 3DS, PNG, BMP)
- Processing of OFML data and creation of article list (ME and PRO)
- Creation and processing of OFML commercial articles (ME and PRO)
- Advanced print layout tool (PRO)
- Dimension styles (PRO)
- Batch Rendering (PRO)
- IFC Export and Import (PRO)
- and more

=== Data formats ===
pCon.planner supports the import and export of several file formats:

3D model export:

- DWG (native file format), DXF, DWT, 3DS, DAE, SKP, OBJ, FBX

2D/3D model import:

- DWG (native file format), DXF, DWT, SAT, SAB, 3DS, SKP, FML, ENV, OGRP

2D raster files import/export:

- JPEG, TIFF, PNG, GIF, JPG

== pCon.planner ME and PRO ==
In addition to the free version of pCon.planner there are also two others with further functionality. The pCon.planner ME and PRO both contain extra features needed in field of space and interior planning like the processing of commercial and geometric data (OFML). Additionally, the PRO version contains other advanced functions for printing and layouting.
