= Bechtle =

Company

Bechtle AG
- Company type: Aktiengesellschaft
- Traded as: FWB: BC8; MDAX Component
- Industry: IT services
- Founded: 1983; 43 years ago
- Headquarters: Neckarsulm, Germany
- Key people: Thomas Olemotz (CEO)
- Revenue: >€6 billion (2022)
- Number of employees: 14.046(December 2022)
- Website: www.bechtle.com

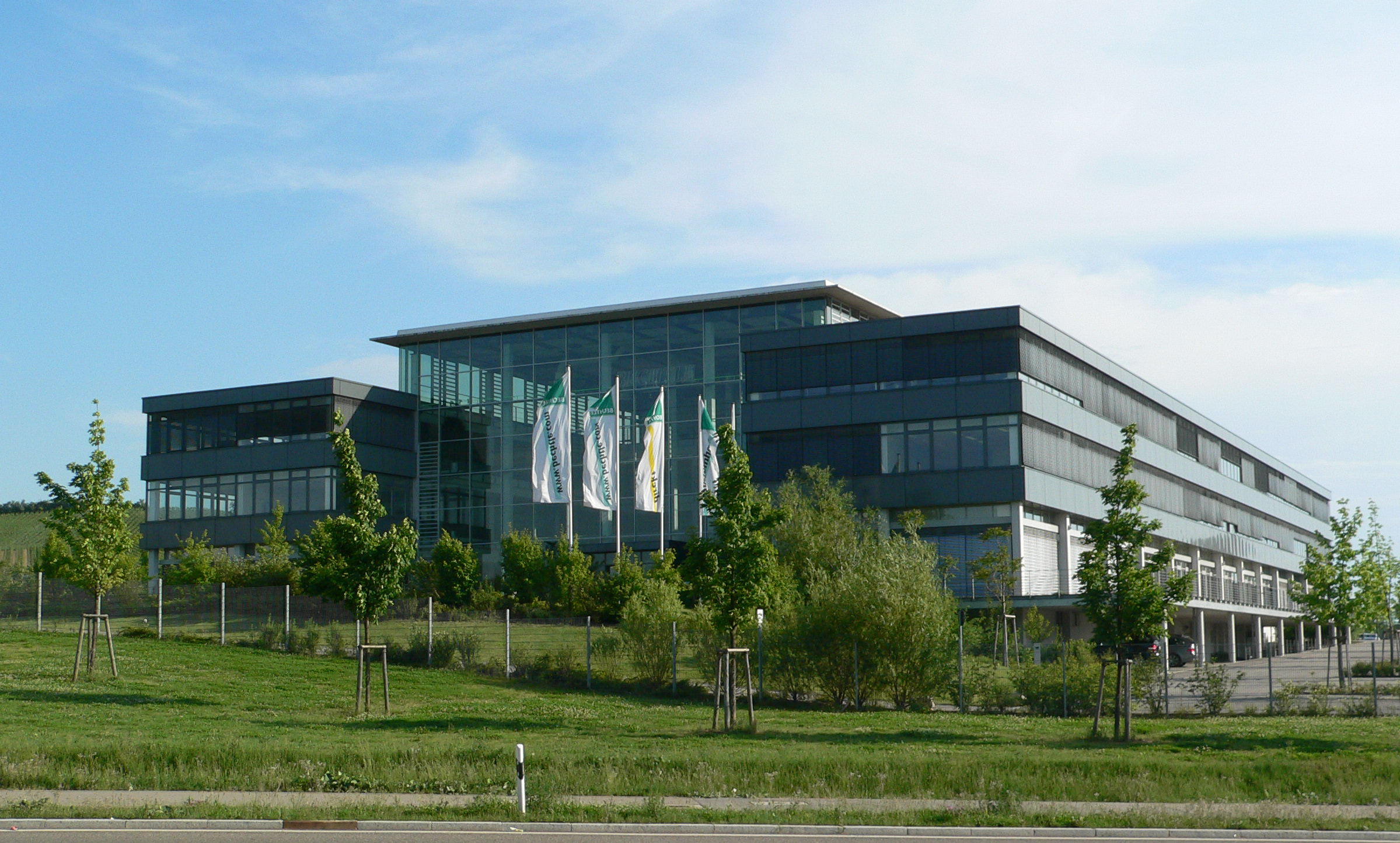
Bechtle's headquarters in Neckarsulm, Baden-Württemberg

Bechtle AG is a multinational technology company with a business model combining information technology services with the direct sale of hardware and software IT products, as well as the operation and maintenance of IT infrastructure for industrial customers and public-sector clients. The Bechtle Group is headquartered in Neckarsulm, Baden-Württemberg, and organised into multiple parent and holding companies.

The company has 70 locations in german-speaking regions and trading companies in 14 European countries. A survey conducted by German industry publications Computerwoche and ChannelPartner ranks Bechtle as the largest business-to-business IT service provider by revenue in Germany in 2018.

== History ==
Bechtle was first established in 1983 by former Heilbronn University students Klaus von Jan, Ralf Klenk and Gerhard Schick. Its first operations were set up in a small shop in Heilbronn. In 1995, the company reached a milestone with revenues exceeding 100 million German Mark (approx. €51 million as of January 2001) and began trading over the internet.

At Bechtle's IPO on 30 March 2000, the stock was listed on the Neuer Markt segment of Germany's stock exchange Deutsche Börse, and has been listed on the TecDax since 2004. In 2012, revenues exceeded €2bn for the first time. In August 2018, Bechtle concluded a framework agreement with the Bundeswehr. From 24 September 2018, the share is listed in the MDAX in addition to the TecDAX. In mid-October 2018, Bechtle AG won a software tender from the EU Commission for the supply of software up to 2025 with a volume of 52 million euros per year. In November 2022, it was announced Bechtle had acquired the Northampton-headquartered cybersecurity, managed IT and cloud service specialists, ACS Systems.

== Organisation ==
Bechtle AG owns or has shares in some 100 companies. As the parent organisation, it provides centralised services to all subsidiaries including investor relations and corporate communications, human resources, quality and risk management, and corporate IT. The company's direct subsidiaries include:

- Bechtle Logistik & Service GmbH, responsible for purchasing, warehouse and product management, marketing and related services
- Bechtle Systemhaus Holding AG, responsible for all service business activities in Germany and Austria
- Bechtle E-Commerce Holding AG, responsible for all e-commerce business under the Bechtle direct brand
- Bechtle Managed Services AG, responsible for outsourcing services
- Bechtle Holding Schweiz AG, responsible for all service and e-commerce business activities in Switzerland including the brands ARP and Comsoft direct

== Business Segments and Portfolio ==
The group's activities are organised into two business segments under dedicated executive management:

- The IT Systemhaus & Managed Services segment spans all service business activities with service units and specialised competence centres in Germany, Austria and Switzerland
- The IT E-commerce segment covers a portfolio of some 70,000 IT products sold via online shops, catalogues and telesales under the brands ARP, Bechtle direct and Comsoft direct
