= PROS (company) =

American software company

PROS Holdings, Inc.
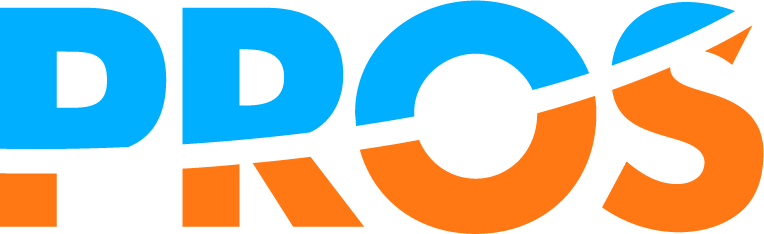
- Type: Public
- Traded as: NYSE: PRO; Russell 2000 Index component
- Industry: Enterprise software
- Headquarters: Houston, Texas, U.S.
- Products: Pricing science Configure, price and quote Revenue management
- Revenue: ▲US$330.4 million (2024)
- Operating income: US$−19 million (2024)
- Net income: US$−20.5 million (2024)
- Total assets: ▼US$419.9 million (2024)
- Website: pros.com

PROS Holdings, Inc. is a technology company that provides revenue management, dynamic pricing, and digital retailing solutions. Following its acquisition by investment firm Thoma Bravo, the company separated its B2B and airline businesses, refocusing its operations exclusively on the airline industry. Headquartered in Houston, Texas, PROS operates globally with offices across Europe and North America, including locations in Frankfurt, Germany, and Sofia, Bulgaria.

== History ==
In June 2007, PROS became a publicly traded company following its initial public offering which raised $75.1 million at $11 per share.

In 2024, PROS was described by the Houston Business Journal as one of the largest Houston-Area public companies.

On June 2, 2025 Jeff Cotten became president and CEO, succeeding Andres Reiner, who moved into a senior advisory role.

In September 2025, private equity firm Thoma Bravo announced it's intent to acquire PROS for $1.4 billion and take the company private. As part of the transaction, PROS' B2B assets were slated to combine with Conga, another Thoma Bravo portfolio company.

== Mergers and Acquisitions ==
PROS first acquisition occurred in October 2013 with the purchase of Cameleon Software, a provider of Configure, Price, Quote (CPQ) tools, for $33 million. Later that year, PROS acquired SignalDemand for $13.5 million.

In 2017, the company acquired Vayant Travel Technologies, an airfare search company based in Sofia, Bulgaria, for $35 million. This was followed by the acquisition of French travel technology firm Travelaer SAS in 2019 for $12 million.

In 2021, PROS acquired Miami-based fare-marketing company EveryMundo for $90 million.
