= Multiphase topology optimisation =

The Multi Phase Topology Optimisation is a simulation technique based on the principle of the finite element method which is able to determine the optimal distribution of two or more different materials in combination under thermal and mechanical loads.

The objective of optimization is to minimize the component's elastic energy. Conventional topology optimisation methods which simulate adaptive bone mineralization have the disadvantage that there is a continuous change of mass by the growth process. However, MPTO keeps all initial material concentrations and uses methods adapted for molecular dynamics to find energy minimum. Applying MPTO to Mechanically loaded components with a high number of different material densities, the optimization results show graded and sometimes anisotropic porosity distributions which are very similar to natural bone structures. This allows the macro- and microstructure of a mechanical component in one step. This method uses the Rapid Prototyping techniques, 3D printing and selective laser sintering to produce very stiff, light weight components with graded porosities calculated by MPTO.
