= Knowledge-based configuration =

AI customization approach

Knowledge-based configuration, also referred to as product configuration or product customization, is an activity of customising a product to meet the needs of a particular customer. The product in question may consist of mechanical parts, services, and software. Knowledge-based configuration is a major application area for artificial intelligence (AI), and it is based on modelling of the configurations in a manner that allows the utilisation of AI techniques for searching for a valid configuration to meet the needs of a particular customer. (Note: M. Stumptner, An Overview of Knowledge-Based Configuration. AI Commun. 10(2): 111–125, 1997.) (Note: D. Sabin and R. Weigel, Product Configuration Frameworks – A Survey, IEEE Intelligent Systems, vol. 13, no. 4, pp. 42–49, 1998.) (Note: T. Soininen, J. Tiihonen, T. Männistö, and R. Sulonen, Towards a General Ontology of Configuration. AI EDAM (Artificial Intelligence for Engineering Design, Analysis and Manufacturing), 12(4): 357–372, 1998) (Note: A. Felfernig, G. Friedrich, and D. Jannach, Conceptual modeling for configuration of mass-customizable products, Artificial Intelligence in Engineering 15(2): 165–176, 2001) (Note: Y. Wang, and M. Tseng, Adaptive Attribute Selection for Configurator Design via Shapley Value. Artificial Intelligence for Engineering Design, Analysis and Manufacturing, 25 (1): 189–199, 2011.) (Note: A. Felfernig, L. Hotz, C. Bagley, and J. Tiihonen, Knowledge-based Configuration: From Research to Business Cases, Elsevier/Morgan Kaufmann, 2014.) (Note: L. Hvam, N. Mortensen, J. Riis, Product Customization, Springer Verlag, 2008.) (Note: C. Forza, F. Salvador, Product Information Management for Mass Customization, Palgrave Macmillan, 2006.)

== Background ==
Knowledge-based configuration (of complex products and services) has a long history as an artificial intelligence application area, see, e.g. (Note: V. Barker, D. O’Connor, J. Bachant, and E. Soloway, Expert systems for configuration at Digital: XCON and beyond, Communications of the ACM, vol. 32, no. 3, pp. 298–318, 1989.) (Note: G. Fleischanderl, G. Friedrich, A. Haselboeck, H. Schreiner, and M. Stumptner, Configuring Large Systems Using Generative Constraint Satisfaction, IEEE Intelligent Systems, vol. 13, no. 4, pp. 59–68, 1998.) (Note: C. Forza and F. Salvador, Managing for variety in the order acquisition and fulfillment process: The contribution of product configuration systems, International Journal of Production Economics, no. 76, pp. 87–98, 2002.) (Note: E. Juengst and M. Heinrich, Using Resource Balancing to Configure Modular Systems, IEEE Intelligent Systems, vol. 13, no. 4, pp. 50–58, 1998.) (Note: D. Mailharro, A classification and constraint-based framework for configuration, Artificial Intelligence for Engineering, Design, Analysis and Manufacturing Journal, Special Issue: Configuration Design, vol. 12, no. 4, pp. 383–397, 1998.) (Note: S. Mittal and F. Frayman, Towards a Generic Model of Configuration Tasks, in 11th International Joint Conference on Artificial Intelligence, Detroit, MI, 1989, pp. 1395–1401.) Informally, configuration can be defined as a "special case of design activity, where the artifact being configured is assembled from instances of a fixed set of well-defined component types which can be composed conforming to a set of constraints". Such constraints (Note: F. Rossi, P. Van Beek, T. Walsh, Handbook of Constraint Programming, Elsevier, 2006.) represent technical restrictions, restrictions related to economic aspects, and conditions related to production processes. The result of a configuration process is a product configuration (concrete configuration), i.e., a list of instances and in some cases also connections between these instances. Examples of such configurations are computers to be delivered or financial service portfolio offers (e.g., a combination of loan and corresponding risk insurance).

=== Theory and complexity of configuration ===
Numerous practical configuration problems can be analyzed by the theoretical framework of Najmann and Stein, (Note: O. Najmann and B. Stein, A Theoretical Framework for Configuration. Lecture Notes in Artificial Intelligence, vol. 604, pp 441-450, Springer, 1992.) an early axiomatic approach that does not presuppose any particular knowledge representation formalism. One important result of this methodology is that typical optimization problems (e.g. finding a cost-minimal configuration) are NP-complete. Thus they require (potentially) excessive computation time, making heuristic configuration algorithms the preferred choice for complex artifacts (products, services).

== Configuration systems ==
Configuration systems, also referred to as configurators or mass customization toolkits, (Note: N. Franke and F. Piller, Configuration Toolkits for Mass Customization: Setting a Research Agenda, Working Paper No. 33 of the Dept. of General and Industrial Management, Technische Universitaet Muenchen, no. ISSN 0942-5098, 2002.) are one of the most successfully applied artificial intelligence technologies. Examples are the automotive industry, the telecommunication industry, the computer industry, (Note: D. McGuiness and J. Wright, An Industrial Strength Description Logics-Based Configurator Platform, IEEE Intelligent Systems, vol. 13, no. 4, pp. 69–77, 1998.) and power electric transformers. Starting with rule-based approaches such as R1/XCON, model-based representations of knowledge (in contrast to rule-based representations) have been developed that strictly separate product domain knowledge from problem solving knowledge—examples thereof are the constraint satisfaction problem, the Boolean satisfiability problem, and different answer set programming (ASP) representations. There are two commonly cited conceptualizations of configuration knowledge. The most important concepts in these are components, ports, resources and functions. This separation of product domain knowledge and problem solving knowledge increased the effectiveness of configuration application development and maintenance, (Note: S. Mittal and B. Falkenhainer, Dynamic Constraint Satisfaction Problems, in National Conference on Artificial Intelligence (AAAI 90), Boston, MA, 1990, pp. 25–32.) since changes in the product domain knowledge do not affect search strategies and vice versa.

Configurators are also often considered as "open innovation toolkits", i.e., tools that support customers in the product identification phase. (Note: E. von Hippel, User Toolkits for Innovation, Journal of Product Innovation Management, vol. 18, no. 4, pp. 247-257, 2001.) In this context customers are innovators who articulate their requirements leading to new innovative products. (Note: F. Piller and M. Tseng, The Customer Centric Enterprise, Advances in Mass Customization and Personalization. Springer Verlag, 2003, pp. 3–16.) (Note: Y. Wang, and M. Tseng, An Approach to Improve the Efficiency of Configurators. In Proceedings of IEEE International Conference on Industrial Engineering and Engineering Management, 2007.) "Mass Confusion" (Note: C. Huffman and B. Kahn, Variety for Sale: Mass Customization or Mass Confusion, Journal of Retailing, no. 74, pp. 491–513, 1998.) – the overwhelming of customers by a large number of possible solution alternatives (choices) – is a phenomenon that often comes with the application of configuration technologies. This phenomenon motivated the creation of personalized configuration environments taking into account a customer's knowledge and preferences. (Note: U. Junker, Preference programming for configuration, in IJCAI’01 Workshop on Configuration, Seattle, WA, 2001.) (Note: L. Ardissono, A. Felfernig, G. Friedrich, D. Jannach, G. Petrone, R. Schaefer, and M. Zanker, A Framework for the development of personalized, distributed web-based configuration systems, AI Magazine, vol. 24, no. 3, pp. 93–108, 2003.)

== Configuration process ==
Core configuration, i.e., guiding the user and checking the consistency of user requirements with the knowledge base, solution presentation and translation of configuration results into bill of materials (BOM) are major tasks to be supported by a configurator. (Note: A. Haag, Product Configuration in SAP: A Retrospective, in Book: Knowledge-based Configuration - From Research to Business Cases, Elsevier/Morgan Kaufmann, pp. 319-337, 2014.) (Note: U. Blumöhr, M. Münch, M. Ukalovic, Variant Configuration with SAP, Galileo Press, 2012.) (Note: A. Felfernig, Standardized Configuration Knowledge Representations as Technological Foundation for Mass Customization, IEEE Transactions on Engineering Management, 54(1), pp. 41–56, 2007.) Configuration knowledge bases are often built using proprietary languages. (Note: A. Haag, Sales Configuration in Business Processes, IEEE Intelligent Systems, vol. 13, no. 4, pp. 78–85, 1998.) In most cases knowledge bases are developed by knowledge engineers who elicit product, marketing and sales knowledge from domain experts. Configuration knowledge bases are composed of a formal description of the structure of the product and further constraints restricting the possible feature and component combinations.

Configurators known as characteristic based product configurators use sets of discrete variables that are either binary or have one of several values, and these variables define every possible product variation.

== Software and service configuration ==
Recently, knowledge-based configuration has been extended to service and software configuration. Modeling software configuration has been based on two main approaches: feature modeling, (Note: K. C. Kang, S. G. Cohen, J. A. Hess, W. E. Novak, and A. S. Peterson, Feature-oriented domain analysis (FODA) feasibility study, Technical Report CMU/SEI-90-TR-21 ESD-90-TR-222, Software Engineering Institute, Carnegie Mellon University, 1990) (Note: K. Czarnecki, U. W. Eisenecker, Generative Programming – Methods, Tools, and Applications, Addison Wesley, 2000.) and component-connectors. (Note: R. van Ommering, F. van der Linden, J. Kramer, and J. Magee, The Koala component model for consumer electronics software, IEEE Computer, 33(3): 72–85, 2000.) Kumbang domain ontology combines the previous approaches building on the tradition of knowledge-based configuration. (Note: T. Asikainen, T. Männistö, and T. Soininen, Kumbang: A domain ontology for modelling variability in software product families, Advanced Engineering Informatics, 21(1): 23–40, 2007.)

== See also ==
- Configurator
- Configure price quote
- Constraint satisfaction
- Feature model
- Mass customization
- Open innovation
- Product differentiation
- Product family engineering
- Software product line
