= Configurator =

Personnel who configure systems

Configurators, also known as choice boards, design systems, toolkits, or co-design platforms, manage combinations of hardware and software components. Three primary features of configuration systems are identified by European professors Nikolaus Franke Frank T. Piller as: variations that are represented and guide users through the process; delivers visualized feedback for design variation; and integrates user choices into the product specifications, and communicates the specifications to manufacturing systems.

Though the term “configurator” or “configuration system” is often referenced in literature, but commonly references a software tool. There is little empirical research regarding user interactions with the toolkit, for which Franke and Piller proposed a research agenda, wherein the success of the system is defined by several factors: technological capabilities; integration in the supply chain; facility for hands-on learning; user and result satisfaction; and brand integration.

== Advantages ==
Configurators can be found in various forms and different industries (Felfernig et al. (2014)). They are employed in B2B (business to business), as well as B2C (business to consumer) markets and are operated either by trained staff or customers themselves. Whereas B2B configurators are primarily used to support sales and lift production efficiency, B2C configurators are often employed as design tools that allow customers to "co-design" their own products. This is reflected in different advantages according to usage:

For B2B:

- Lower distribution costs
- Quicker reaction to customer inquiries
- Reduced capital commitment and less overproduction
- Error elimination throughout the ordering and production process
- Quality improvements in customer-service
- Worldwide access to up-to-date product information
- Reduction of item numbers

For B2C:

- Differentiation through individuality
- Reduced capital commitment and less overproduction
- Better knowledge of customers' needs
- Higher customer loyalty
- Shopping as experience

== Enabler of mass customization ==
Configurators enable mass customization, which depends on a deep and efficient integration of customers into value creation. Salvador et al. identified three fundamental capabilities determining the ability of a company to mass-customize its offering, i.e. solution space development, robust process design and choice navigation (Salvador, Martin & Piller (2009)). Configurators serve as an important tool for choice navigation. Configurators have been widely used in e-Commerce. Examples can be found in different industries like accessories, apparel, automobile, food, industrial goods etc. The main challenge of choice navigation lies in the ability to support customers in identifying their own solutions while minimizing complexity and the burden of choice, i.e. improving the experience of customer needs, elicitation and interaction in a configuration process. Many efforts have been put along this direction to enhance the efficiency of configurator design, such as adaptive configurators(Wang & Tseng (2011);Jalali & Leake (2012)). The prediction is integrated into the configurator to improve the quality and speed of configuration process. Configurators may also be used to limit or eliminate mass customization if intended to do so. This is accomplished through limiting of allowable options in data models.

== Existing configuration paradigms ==
According to (Sabin & Weigel (1998)), configurators can be classified as rule based, model based and case based, depending on the reasoning techniques used.

- Rule based: these systems derive solutions in a forward-chaining manner. At each step, the system examines the entire set of rules and considers only the rules it can execute next. Each rule carries its own complete triggering context, which identifies its scope of applicability. The system then selects and executes one of the rules under consideration by performing its action part. Most of early configuration systems fall in this category, like R1/XCON (McDermott (1980)), Cossack (Frayman & Mittal (1987)) and MICON (Birmingham & Siewiorek (1988)). This kind of systems often suffers from the maintenance issues because of the lack of separation between domain knowledge and control strategy, especially when the configurator system is complex.
- Model Based: the main assumption behind model based configurators is the existence of a system's model which consists of decomposable entities and interactions between their elements. As presented by (Hamscher (1994)), the most important advantages of model based systems are a better separation between what is known and how the knowledge is used, enhanced robustness, enhanced compositionality and enhanced re-usability.
- Case based: in case based configurators, the knowledge necessary for reasoning is stored mainly in cases that record a set of configurations sold to earlier customers. With the case based approach, one tries to solve the current configuration problem by finding a similar, previously solved problem and adapting it to the new requirements. The basic processing cycle in a case based configurator is: input customer requirements, retrieve a configuration and adapt the case to the new situation.

== Product configurators in eCommerce ==
Product configurators are widely used in eCommerce to allow customers to customize products before purchase. A product configurator typically enables users to select options such as colors, materials, sizes, or additional features while receiving immediate visual feedback.

Modern eCommerce configurators often include interactive visualization technologies such as 2D image switching or real-time 3D rendering. Some systems also provide pricing updates and compatibility validation for selected options.

Product configurators are commonly used in industries such as furniture, automotive, apparel, jewelry, and industrial equipment. They support product personalization and help customers better understand product variations before making a purchase.

== See also ==
- Mass customization
- Personalization
- Build to order
- Custom-Fit
- Dell
- Personalized marketing
- Product differentiation
- Product management
- Rapid manufacturing
- Knowledge-based Configuration
