= Hypertargeting =

Ability to deliver advertising content to specific interest-based segments

Hypertargeting refers to the ability to deliver advertising content to specific interest-based segments in a network. MySpace coined the term in November 2007 with the launch of their SelfServe advertising solution (later called myAds), described on their site as "enabling online marketers to tap into self-expressed user information to target campaigns like never before."

Hypertargeting is also the ability on social network sites to target ads based on very specific criteria. This is an important step towards precision performance marketing.

The first MySpace HyperTarget release offered advertisers the ability to direct their ads to 10 categories self-identified by users in their profiles, including music, sports, and movies. In July 2007 the targeting options expanded to 100 subcategories. Rather than simply targeting movie lovers, for example, advertisers could send ads based on the preferred genres like horror, romance, or comedy. By January 2010, MySpace HyperTarget involved 5 algorithms across 1,000 segments.

According to an article by Harry Gold in online publisher ClickZ, the general field of hypertageting draws information from 3 sources:

- Registration — basic data gathered when users register for site access (e.g. age, sex, location);
- Profile — detailed content completed by active users (e.g. favorite movies, activities, brands);
- Behavioral history — data gathered from online activities like sites visited, purchases made, groups joined, etc.

Facebook, a popular social network, offers an ad targeting service through their Social Ads platform. Ads can be hypertargeted to users based on keywords from their profiles, pages they're fans of, events they responded to, or applications used. Some of these examples involve the use of behavioral targeting.

By 2009, hypertargeting became an accepted industry term. In 2010, the International Consumer Electronics Show (CES), the world's largest consumer technology tradeshow, dedicated three sessions to the topic:

- Advertising Analytics and Social Media, Search, Video Search and HyperTargeting
- Hypertargeting: Ad Networks, Ad Serving and Ad Targeting
- HyperTargeting and HyperSelecting: Advertising, Search, Content and Aggregation
