= Mass customization =

Technology that allows bespoke aspects in mass production

Mass customization makes use of flexible computer-aided systems to produce custom products. Such systems combine the low unit costs of mass production processes with the flexibility of individual customization.

Mass customization is the new frontier in business for both manufacturing and service industries. At its core, is an increase in variety and customization without a corresponding increase in costs. At its limit, it is the mass production of individually customized goods and services. At its best, it provides strategic advantage and economic value.

== Product design strategy ==
Mass customization is a product design strategy and is currently used with both delayed differentiation and modular design to enhance the value delivered to customers.

Mass customization is the method of, "effectively postponing the task of differentiating a product for a specific customer until the latest possible point in the supply network".

From a collaborative engineering perspective, mass customization can be viewed as collaborative efforts between customers and manufacturers, who have different sets of priorities and need to jointly search for solutions that best match customers' individual specific needs with manufacturers' customization capabilities.

== History ==
Mass customization was anticipated by Alvin Toffler in 1970, and published in Future Shock; the term was later coined by Stan Davis in 1987, in Future Perfect. Joseph Pine II developed the concept further in his 1993 book, Mass Customization - The New Frontier in Business Competition. It was defined by Mitchell M. Tseng and Roger Jianxin Jiao as "producing goods and services to meet individual customers' needs with near mass production efficiency." Andreas Kaplan and Michael Haenlein concurred, calling it "a strategy that creates value by some form of company-customer interaction at the fabrication and assembly stage of the operations level to create customized products with production cost and monetary price similar to those of mass-produced products." Similarly, Ian McCarthy highlights that mass customization involves balancing operational drivers by defining it as, "the capability to manufacture a relatively high volume of product options for a relatively large market (or collection of niche markets) that demands customization, without tradeoffs in cost, delivery and quality."

== Implementation ==
Many implementations of mass customization are operational today, such as software-based product configurators that make it possible to add and/or change functionalities of a core product or to build fully custom enclosures from scratch. This degree of mass customization, however, has only seen limited adoption. If an enterprise's marketing department offers individual products (atomic market fragmentation), it doesn't often mean that a product is produced individually, but rather that similar variants of the same mass-produced item are available. Additionally, in a fashion context, existing technologies to predict clothing size from user input data have been shown to be not yet of high enough suitability for mass customization purposes.

Companies that have succeeded with mass-customization business models tend to supply purely electronic products. However, these are not true "mass customizers" in the original sense, since they do not offer an alternative to mass production of material goods.

== Variants ==
Pine described four types of mass customization in 1993:

- Collaborative customization (also considered co-creation) – Firms talk to individual customers to determine the precise product offering that best serves the customer's needs (see personalized marketing and personal marketing orientation). This information is then used to specify and manufacture a product that suits that specific customer. For example, some clothing companies will manufacture pants or jackets to fit an individual customer. This is also being taken into deeper customization via 3D printing with companies like Shapeways. Examples: Tailored suits; Converse lets consumers choose the color or pattern of every element of certain types of shoes, either in-store or online.
- Adaptive customization – Firms produce a standardized product, but this product is customizable in the hands of the end-user (the customers alter the product themselves). Example: Lutron lights, which are programmable so that customers can easily customize the aesthetic effect.
- Transparent customization – Firms provide individual customers with unique products, without explicitly telling them that the products are customized. In this case there is a need to accurately assess customer needs. Example: Google AdWords and AdSense
- Cosmetic customization – Firms produce a standardized physical product, but market it to different customers in unique ways. Example: The same soft drink may be provided in a 7.5-ounce can, a 12-ounce, a 1-liter bottle, and a 2-liter bottle.

He suggested a business model, "the 8.5-figure-path", a process going from invention to mass production to continuous improvement to mass customization and back to invention.

== Market research ==
Kamis, Koufaris & Stern 2008 described experiments conducted to test the impacts of mass customization when postponed to the stage of retail online shopping. They found that users perceive greater usefulness and enjoyment with a mass customization interface compared with a more typical shopping interface, particularly in a task of moderate complexity.

== See also ==
- Configurator
- Dell
- Industry 4.0
- Knowledge-based configuration
- Long tail
- Mail merge
- Manufacturing
- Personalization
- Personalized marketing
- Product differentiation
- Product management
- Prosumer
- Rapid manufacturing
- Responsive computer-aided design
- Structure chart
- Variable data printing

== Bibliography ==
- Kaplan, Andreas; Haenlein, Michael (2006). "Toward a Parsimonious Definition of Traditional and Electronic Mass Customization". Journal of Product Innovation Management. 23 (2).
- Tseng, Mitchell; Jiao, Jianxin (2001). Handbook of Industrial Engineering. pp. 684–709. ISBN 9780471330578.
- McCarthy, Ian (2004). "Special issue editorial: the what, why and how of mass customization". Production Planning & Control. 15 (4): 347–351.
- Pine, B. Joseph (1993). Mass Customization: The New Frontier in Business Competition. Harvard Business School Press. p. 13. ISBN 9780875843728.
