= Obreshkov =

Obreshkov (Bulgarian: Обрешков) is a Bulgarian surname and patronymic derived from the given name Obreten (Bulgarian: Обретен). Notable individuals with the surname include:

- Alexander Obreshkov (born 1935), Bulgarian screenwriter
- Bencho Obreshkov (1899–1970), Bulgarian painter
- Hristo Obreshkov (1907–1944), Bulgarian violinist
- Nikola Obreshkov (1896–1963), Bulgarian mathematician
