= François Budan de Boislaurent =

French mathematician

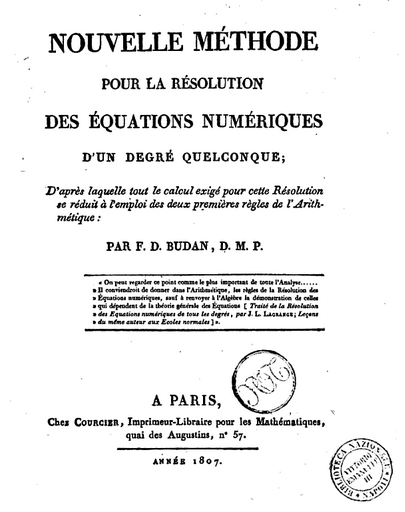
Frontpage of Nouvelle Méthode pour la Résolution des Équations Numériques (1st ed. 1807)

Ferdinand François Désiré Budan de Boislaurent (28 September 1761 – 6 October 1840) was a French amateur mathematician, best known for a tract, Nouvelle méthode pour la résolution des équations numériques, first published in Paris in 1807, but based on work from 1803.

== Life ==
Budan was born in Limonade, Cap-Français, Saint-Domingue (now Haiti) on 28 September 1761. His early education was at Juilly, France. He then proceeded to Paris where he studied medicine, receiving a doctorate for a thesis entitled Essai sur cette question d'économie médicale : Convient-il qu'un malade soit instruit de sa situation? Budan died in Paris on 6 October 1840.

Budan explains in his book how, given a monic polynomial p(x), the coefficients of p(x+1) can be obtained by developing a Pascal-like triangle with first row the coefficients of p(x), rather than by expanding successive powers of x+1, as in Pascal's triangle proper, and then summing; thus, the method has the flavour of lattice path combinatorics. Taken together with Descartes' Rule of Signs, this leads to an upper bound on the number of the real roots a polynomial has inside an open interval. Although Budan's Theorem, as this result was known, was taken up by, among others, Pierre Louis Marie Bourdon (1779-1854), in his celebrated algebra textbook, it tended to be eclipsed by an equivalent result due to Joseph Fourier, as the consequence of a priority dispute. Interest in Budan's theorem has been revived because some further computational results are more easily deducible from it than from Fourier's version of the theorem.

Budan's book was read across the English Channel; for example, Peter Barlow includes mention of it in his entry on Approximation in his Dictionary (1814), although grouping it with the method of Joseph-Louis Lagrange as being accurate, but of more theoretical interest than practical use. Budan's work on approximation was studied by Horner in preparing his celebrated article in the Philosophical Transactions of the Royal Society of London in 1819 that gave rise to the term Horner's method; Horner comments there and elsewhere on Budan's results, at first being sceptical of the value of Budan's work, but later warming to it. Thus, these writers in English have a different appreciation of Budan's work to a French writer, such as Bourdon; indeed, Horner was praised over Budan for being able to go directly from p(x) to p(x+a) for any a, rather than taking this in steps after the manner of Budan. Barlow and Horner show some awareness of the work of another writer in French, Louis-Benjamin Francoeur (1773-1849), who also looked at how to obtain the coefficients of p(x+a) from those of p(x) along the lines of Budan and Horner about the same time as Horner first published his work. But Budan's name and theorem only appear in late editions of Francoeur's book.

Budan, in common with other writers in French of the period working on root extraction, does not mention Paolo Ruffini, notwithstanding Ruffini had been in correspondence with Lagrange; this was not just an English failing. Ruffini's work on the topic dates, in the first instance, from 1804, but, as with Budan and then Horner, several subsequent reworkings.

== Published works ==
- Nouvelle méthode pour la résolution des équations numériques d'un degré quelconque, Dondey-Dupré, Paris, 1822

== Sources ==
- Ferdinand François Désiré Budan de Boislaurent
- Livres Numérisés Mathématiques, Université Joseph Fourier
