= Cohn's theorem =

In mathematics, Cohn's theorem states that a nth-degree self-inversive polynomial $p(z)$ has as many roots in the open unit disk $D =\{z \in \mathbb{C}: |z|<1\}$ as the reciprocal polynomial of its derivative. Cohn's theorem is useful for studying the distribution of the roots of self-inversive and self-reciprocal polynomials in the complex plane.

An nth-degree polynomial,

$$p(z) = p_0 + p_1 z + \cdots + p_n z^n$$

is called self-inversive if there exists a fixed complex number ( $\omega$ ) of modulus 1 so that,

$$p(z) = \omega  p^*(z),\qquad \left(|\omega|=1\right),$$

where

$$p^*(z)=z^n \bar{p}\left(1 / \bar{z}\right) =\bar{p}_n + \bar{p}_{n-1} z + \cdots + \bar{p}_0 z^n$$

is the reciprocal polynomial associated with $p(z)$ and the bar means complex conjugation. Self-inversive polynomials have many interesting properties. For instance, its roots are all symmetric with respect to the unit circle and a polynomial whose roots are all on the unit circle is necessarily self-inversive. The coefficients of self-inversive polynomials satisfy the relations.

$$p_k = \omega \bar{p}_{n-k}, \qquad 0 \leqslant k \leqslant n.$$

In the case where $\omega = 1,$ a self-inversive polynomial becomes a complex-reciprocal polynomial (also known as a self-conjugate polynomial). If its coefficients are real then it becomes a real self-reciprocal polynomial.

The formal derivative of $p(z)$ is a (n − 1)th-degree polynomial given by

$$q(z) =p'(z) =  p_1 + 2p_2 z + \cdots + n p_n z^{n-1}.$$

Therefore, Cohn's theorem states that both $p(z)$ and the polynomial

$$q^*(z) =z^{n-1}\bar{q}_{n-1}\left(1 / \bar{z}\right) = z^{n-1} \bar{p}' \left(1 / \bar{z}\right) = n \bar{p}_n + (n-1)\bar{p}_{n-1} z + \cdots + \bar{p}_1 z^{n-1}$$

have the same number of roots in $|z|<1.$

== See also ==
- Geometrical properties of polynomial roots
