= J. V. Uspensky =

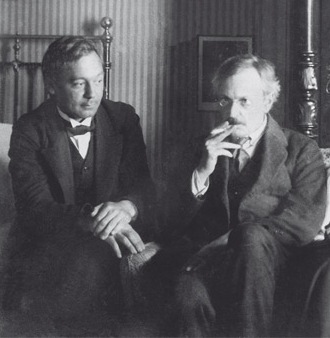
- Delaunay (left) with Uspensky
- Born: Yakov Viktorovich Uspensky (Russian: Яков Викторович Успенский); April 29, 1883; Urga, Outer Mongolia
- Died: January 27, 1947 (aged 63); San Francisco, United States
- Education: University of Saint Petersburg
- Scientific career
- Fields: Mathematics, number theory, probability theory
- Workplaces: Stanford University, University of Minnesota
- Doctoral advisor: Andrey Markov
- Notable students: Carl D. Olds; Ivan Vinogradov; Rodion Kuzmin

James Victor Uspensky (Russian: Яков Викторович Успенский, romanized: Yakov Viktorovich Uspensky; April 29, 1883 – January 27, 1947) was a Russian and American mathematician notable for writing Theory of Equations.

== Biography ==
Uspensky graduated from the University of Saint Petersburg in 1906 and received his doctorate from the University of St. Petersburg in 1910. He was a member of the Russian Academy of Sciences from 1921.

Uspensky joined the faculty of Stanford University in 1929-30 and 1930–31 as acting professor of mathematics. He was professor of mathematics at Stanford from 1931 until his death. Uspensky was the one who kept alive Vincent's theorem of 1834 and 1836, carrying the torch (so to speak) from Serret.

== Work in probability theory ==
In his 1937 textbook Introduction to Mathematical Probability, Uspensky presented a detailed reconstruction of Aleksandr Lyapunov’s proof of the central limit theorem. The textbook also discussed a version of the theorem for two-state Markov chains. These aspects of Uspensky’s work were examined by mathematicians Persi Diaconis and Sandy Zabell in a 2023 historical study..

== Books ==
- Uspensky, J. V. (1948). Theory of equations.
- Uspensky, J. V.; Heaslet, M. A. (1939). Elementary Number Theory.
- Uspensky, J. V. (1937). Introduction to mathematical probability.
