= Nikola Obreshkov =

Bulgarian mathematician

Nikola Dimitrov Obreshkov (Bulgarian: Никола Димитров Обрешков; March 6, 1896 in Varna – August 11, 1963 in Sofia) was a prominent Bulgarian mathematician, working in complex analysis.

== See also ==
- Obreschkoff–Ostrowski theorem
