= Descartes's rule of signs =

Counting polynomial real roots based on coefficients

In mathematics, Descartes's rule of signs, described by René Descartes in his La Géométrie, counts the roots of a polynomial by examining sign changes in its coefficients. The number of positive real roots is at most the number of sign changes in the sequence of the polynomial's coefficients (omitting zero coefficients), and the difference between the root count and the sign change count is always even. In particular, when the number of sign changes is zero or one, then there are exactly zero or one positive roots.

A linear fractional transformation of the variable makes it possible to use the rule of signs to count roots in any interval. This is the basic idea of Budan's theorem and the Budan–Fourier theorem. Repeated division of an interval in two results in a set of disjoint intervals, each containing one root, and together listing all the roots. This approach is used in the fastest algorithms today for computer computation of real roots of polynomials (see real-root isolation).

Descartes himself used the transformation x → −x for using his rule for getting information of the number of negative roots.

== Descartes's rule of signs ==
=== Positive roots ===
The rule states that if the nonzero terms of a single-variable polynomial with real coefficients are ordered by descending variable exponent, then the number of positive roots of the polynomial is either equal to the number of sign changes between consecutive (nonzero) coefficients, or is less than it by an even number. A root of multiplicity k is counted as k roots.

In particular, if the number of sign changes is zero or one, the number of positive roots equals the number of sign changes.

=== Negative roots ===
As a corollary of the rule, the number of negative roots is the number of sign changes after multiplying the coefficients of odd-power terms by −1, or fewer than it by an even number. This procedure is equivalent to substituting the negation of the variable for the variable itself. For example, the negative roots of $ax^3+bx^2+cx+d$ are the positive roots of
$$a(-x)^3+b(-x)^2+c(-x)+d = -ax^3+bx^2-cx+d.$$
Thus, applying Descartes's rule of signs to this polynomial gives the maximum number of negative roots of the original polynomial.

=== Example: cubic polynomial ===
The polynomial
$$f(x) = + x^3 + x^2 - x - 1$$
has one sign change between the second and third terms, as the sequence of signs is (+, +, −, −). Therefore, it has exactly one positive root. To find the number of negative roots, change the signs of the coefficients of the terms with odd exponents, i.e., apply Descartes's rule of signs to the polynomial $f(-x)= - x^3 + x^2 + x - 1 .$

This polynomial has two sign changes, as the sequence of signs is (−, +, +, −), meaning that this second polynomial has two or zero positive roots; thus the original polynomial has two or zero negative roots.

In fact, the factorization of the first polynomial is
$$f(x)=(x + 1)^{2}(x - 1),$$
so the roots are −1 (twice) and +1 (once).

The factorization of the second polynomial is $f(-x)=-(x - 1)^{2}(x + 1).$

So here, the roots are +1 (twice) and −1 (once), the negation of the roots of the original polynomial.

== Proof ==
The following is a rough outline of a proof. First, some preliminary definitions:

- Write the polynomial $f(x)$ as $\sum_{i=0}^n a_i x^{b_i}$ where we have integer powers $0 \leq b_0 < b_1 < \cdots < b_n$, and nonzero coefficients $a_i \neq 0$.
- Let $V(f)$ be the number of sign changes of the coefficients of $f$, meaning the number of $k$ such that $a_k a_{k+1} < 0$.
- Let $Z(f)$ be the number of strictly positive roots (counting multiplicity).

With these, we can formally state Descartes's rule as follows:

Theorem—The number of strictly positive roots (counting multiplicity) of $f$ is equal to the number of sign changes in the coefficients of $f$, minus a nonnegative even number.

If $b_0 > 0$, then we can divide the polynomial by $x^{b_0}$, which would not change its number of strictly positive roots. Thus without loss of generality, let $b_0 = 0$.

Lemma—If $a_na_0 > 0$, then $Z(f)$ is even. If $a_0a_n < 0$, then $Z(f)$ is odd.

Proof of Lemma

$f(x)$ starts at $f(0) = a_0 > 0$ and ends at $f(+\infty) = +\infty > 0$, so it must cross the positive x-axis an even number of times (each of which contributes an odd number of roots), and each instance where it glances off (without crossing) the positive x-axis contributes an even number of roots.

The other case is similar.

Proof of main theorem

From the lemma, it follows that $Z(f)$ and $V(f)$ always have the same parity. It remains to show $Z(f) \leq V(f)$.

We induct on $n$. If $n = 0, 1$, then it is obvious. Now assume $n \geq 2$.

By induction hypothesis, $Z(f') = V(f') - 2s$ for some integer $s\geq 0$.

By Rolle's theorem, there exists at least one positive root of $f'$ between any two different positive roots of $f$. Also, any $k$ -multiple positive root of $f$ is a $k-1$ -multiple root of $f'$. Thus $Z(f') \geq Z(f) - 1$.

If $a_0a_1 > 0$, then $V(f') = V(f)$, else $V(f') = V(f) - 1$. In both cases, $V(f') \leq V(f)$

Together, we have
$$Z(f) \leq Z(f') + 1 = V(f') - 2s + 1 \leq V(f) -2s + 1 \leq V(f) + 1$$
Further, since $Z(f)$ and $V(f)$ have the same parity, we have $Z(f) \leq V(f)$.

== Nonreal roots ==
Any nth degree polynomial has exactly n roots in the complex plane, if counted according to multiplicity. So if f(x) is a polynomial with real coefficients which does not have a root at 0 (that is a polynomial with a nonzero constant term) then the minimum number of nonreal roots is equal to
$$n-(p+q),$$
where p denotes the maximum number of positive roots, q denotes the maximum number of negative roots (both of which can be found using Descartes's rule of signs), and n denotes the degree of the polynomial.

=== Example: some zero coefficients and nonreal roots ===
The polynomial
$$f(x) = x^3-1 ,$$
has one sign change; so the maximum number of positive real roots is one. As
$$f(-x) = -x^3-1 ,$$
has no sign change, the original polynomial has no negative real roots. So the minimum number of nonreal roots is
$$3 - (1+0) = 2 .$$

Since nonreal roots of a polynomial with real coefficients must occur in conjugate pairs, it means that x^{3} − 1 has exactly two nonreal roots and one real root, which is positive.

== Special case ==
The even difference between the number of sign changes and the number of positive roots is positive when the polynomial has pairs of conjugate nonreal roots with positive real parts. Thus, if the polynomial is known to have all real roots, Descartes's rule allows one to find the exact number of positive and negative roots. Since it is easy to determine the multiplicity of zero as a root, the sign of all roots can be determined in this case.

== Generalizations ==
If the real polynomial P has k real positive roots counted with multiplicity, then for every a > 0 there are at least k changes of sign in the sequence of coefficients of the Taylor series of the function e^{ax}P(x). For sufficiently large a, there are exactly k such changes of sign.

In the 1970s Askold Khovanskii developed the theory of fewnomials that generalises Descartes's rule. The rule of signs can be thought of as stating that the number of real roots of a polynomial is dependent on the polynomial's complexity, and that this complexity is proportional to the number of monomials it has, not its degree. Khovanskiǐ showed that this holds true not just for polynomials but for algebraic combinations of many transcendental functions, the so-called Pfaffian functions.

== See also ==
- Sturm's theorem – Counting polynomial roots in an interval
- Rational root theorem – Relationship between the rational roots of a polynomial and its extreme coefficients
- Geometrical properties of polynomial roots – Geometry of the location of polynomial roots
- Gauss–Lucas theorem – Geometric relation between the roots of a polynomial and those of its derivative
