= Bairstow =

Bairstow is a surname. Notable people with the surname include:

== Sports people ==
- Andrew Bairstow (born 1975), English cricketer, son of David Bairstow
- Angela Bairstow (1942–2016), English international badminton player
- Arthur Bairstow (1868–1945), English cricketer
- Billy Bairstow (fl. 1890s), English footballer
- Cameron Bairstow (born 1990), Australian basketball player
- David Bairstow (1951–1998), English cricketer
- Jarred Bairstow (born 1992), Australian professional basketball player
- Jonny Bairstow (born 1989), English cricketer, son of David Bairstow
- Mark Bairstow (born 1963), Australian rules footballer
- Pamela Bairstow (born 1954), British swimmer
- Stephanie Bairstow (born 1994), Australian professional basketball player

== Other ==
- Caitlyn Bairstow, Canadian voice actress
- David Bairstow (filmmaker) (1921–1985), Canadian producer and director
- Sir Edward Bairstow (1874–1946), English organist and composer
- Ernest C. Bairstow (1876–1962), Anglo-American architectural sculptor
- Jack E. Bairstow (1902–1963), American politician
- Leonard Bairstow (1880–1963), English academic, originator of Bairstow's method for finding the roots of polynomials
- Myra Bairstow, American writer and independent art scholar and curator
- Scott Bairstow (born 1970), Canadian actor

== See also ==
- Bairstow v Queens Moat Houses plc, 2001 UK lawsuit
- Bairstow Eves, British estate agency
- Bairstow's method, method for finding roots of a polynomial
