= List of things named after the Bernoulli family =

The following is a list of things named after the famed Bernoulli family of Basel.

- Bernoulli differential equation
- Bernoulli distribution
- Bernoulli number
- Bernoulli polynomials
- Bernoulli process
- Bernoulli Society for Mathematical Statistics and Probability
- Bernoulli trial
- Bernoulli's principle
- Bernoulli's triangle
- Rue Bernoulli (Bernoulli Road) in Paris 8 - Rue Bernoulli in Paris 8 was named rue Bernouilli in 1867 and renamed to the correct spelling in 1994
- Bernoulli crater - Spelled Bernouilli in the moon atlas by Beer & Mädler (1836), and hence adopted as the official name by the IAU in 1935; the IAU changed the official name to Bernoulli in 2003
- French submarine Bernouilli

== Daniel Bernoulli ==
- Bernoulli Box
- Bernoulli grip
- Bernoulli's method
- Bernoulli principle
- Euler–Bernoulli beam theory

== Jakob Bernoulli ==
- Bernoulli differential equation
- Bernoulli numbers
  - Poly-Bernoulli number
- Bernoulli's formula
- Bernoulli polynomials
- Bernoulli map
- Bernoulli operator
- Hidden Bernoulli model
  - Time-inhomogeneous hidden Bernoulli model
- Bernoulli sampling
- Bernoulli distribution
  - Continuous Bernoulli distribution
  - Generalized Bernoulli distribution
- Bernoulli trial
- Bernoulli process
- Bernoulli scheme
- Bernoulli random variable
- Bernoulli's Golden Theorem (Law of Large numbers)
- Bernoulli's inequality
- Lemniscate of Bernoulli

== Johann Bernoulli ==
- Bernoulli's rule, see L'Hopital's rule
- Bernoulli's identity, see Sophomore's dream

== See also ==
- Bernoulli (disambiguation)
