= Pamela McCorduck =

British-American writer (1940–2021)

- Born: October 27, 1940; Liverpool, UK
- Died: October 18, 2021 (aged 80); Walnut Creek, California, US
- Education: University of California, Berkeley (BA); Columbia University (MFA)
- Occupations: Non-fiction writer; journalist
- Spouses: Thomas Tellefsen (divorced) Joseph F. Traub (m. 1969; died 2015)
- Writing career
- Period: 1979–2021
- Notable works: Machines Who Think (1979, 2004); The Fifth Generation (1983) (with Edward Feigenbaum)

Pamela Ann McCorduck (October 27, 1940 – October 18, 2021) was a British-born American author of books about the history and philosophical significance of artificial intelligence, the future of engineering, and the role of women and technology. She also wrote three novels. She contributed to Omni, The New York Times, Daedalus, and the Michigan Quarterly Review, and was a contributing editor of Wired. She was a former vice president of the PEN American Center. She was married to computer scientist and academic Joseph F. Traub.

== Early life ==
McCorduck was born on October 27, 1940, in Liverpool, United Kingdom, to Hilda (née Bond) and William J. "Jack" McCorduck. The city was being bombed by the German Luftwaffe at the time of her birth. Her mother was a beautician and teacher, while her father owned beauty colleges, including the one where her mother taught. She was the eldest of three siblings, with the younger two being twins. She moved to Stamford, Connecticut, in the United States, with her family, when she was 6. The family moved in the RMS Queen Elizabeth, an ocean liner that took them to Ellis Island in 1946.

She lived in Rutherford, New Jersey, where she graduated from Rutherford High School before moving west and earning a bachelor's degree in English literature from University of California, Berkeley, in 1960. Many years later, she obtained her master's degree in English literature from Columbia University.

== Career ==
McCorduck started out supporting professors Edward Feigenbaum, who would later go on to be known as the father of expert systems, and Julian Feldman, at UC Berkeley in their book on artificial intelligence, entitled Computers & Thought (1963). She stayed on as an executive assistant to Feigenbaum as he moved to Stanford University to set up the university's computer science department in 1965. She moved to Seattle, with her husband Joseph F. Traub, whom she had met in Stanford, when he moved to the University of Washington; she later moved to Pittsburgh, where she taught at Carnegie Mellon University. During these years, she wrote two of her novels, Familiar Relations (1971; about a family in Liverpool) and Working to the End (1972).

While at Carnegie Mellon she taught in the English department, but was introduced to scientists working on artificial intelligence, including professor Herbert A. Simon, who championed the idea that computers could match human thinking by exhibiting artificial intelligence. She continued to interact with the scientists and researchers, including Raj Reddy and Allen Newell, many of whom she interviewed. During this time, she wrote Machines Who Think: A Personal Inquiry Into the History and Prospects of Artificial Intelligence (1979), which was funded by the university. The book ended up chronicling the early years of research in artificial intelligence. She wrote about researchers who were studying expert systems, robotics, problem solving, general game playing, and speech recognition, becoming one of the pre-eminent writers on the topic who were able to explain the topics to a broad audience. Her conversational tone of writing as well as observational skills were credited with distinguishing her writings from other works on these topics. Her book, Machines Who Think: A Personal Inquiry Into the History and Prospects of Artificial Intelligence had its twenty-fifth year edition with updates capturing progress in the field of artificial intelligence through 2004.

McCorduck moved to Columbia University in 1979, teaching creative writing, when her husband Traub was appointed the first chairman of the computer science department at Columbia. She continued to write on artificial intelligence and related topics, including books such as The Universal Machine (1985), The Rise of the Expert Company (1988), and Aaron's Code (1990). Her book, Futures of Women (1996), used scenario planning to study potential trajectories for the economic and social futures of women. She also wrote two novels, The Edge of Chaos (2007) and Bounded Rationality (2012). Her last book was a memoir, This Could Be Important: My Life and Times With the Artificial Intelligentsia (2019), in which she regretted not calling attention to the potential misuse of artificial intelligence earlier. Throughout her career, she wrote eleven books, including three novels, which were all published.

McCorduck served as a board member and later as the vice president of the PEN American Center. She was chairperson of a committee that studied the long-range reorganization of the PEN America. She was a contributor to Omni, The New York Times, Daedalus, Michigan Quarterly Review and was a contributing editor of Wired. The Carnegie Mellon University library hosts the Traub-McCorduck collection set up in 2018, based on her contributions, which included early counting machines, manuscripts, books and artifacts documenting the history of computing, including two enigma machines. In 2020, she was appointed a board member of the University of California Libraries.

== Personal life ==
McCorduck married Joseph F. Traub, a professor at Stanford University in 1969, after her first marriage to Thomas Tellefsen ended in a divorce. In 2002, the couple bought a house in Santa Fe, New Mexico, and would split their time between the city and New York. She moved to California after her husband's death in 2015.

McCorduck died on October 18, 2021, at her Walnut Creek, California, home, nine days before her 81st birthday. She was survived by her sister, Mrs. Sandra Marona, and her brother, John McCorduck, as well as three nephews, four nieces and two step-daughters.

== Selected works ==
- Machines Who Think (1st ed.). W. H. Freeman. 1979. Archived from the original on March 1, 2020.
- The Universal Machine: Confessions of a Technological Optimist. San Diego: Harcourt Brace Jovanovich. 1986. ISBN 0-15-692873-6.
- AARON's Code : Meta-art, Artificial Intelligence, and the Work of Harold Cohen. New York: W.H. Freeman. 1997. ISBN 0-7167-2173-2. Archived from the original on January 10, 2009.
- Machines Who Think: A Personal Inquiry into the History and Prospects of Artificial Intelligence (2nd ed.). Natick, Mass.: A.K. Peters. 2004. ISBN 1-56881-205-1.
- The Edge of Chaos : a novel. Santa Fe: Sunstone Press. 2007. ISBN 978-0-86534-578-2.
- Bounded Rationality : a novel. Santa Fe: Sunstone Press. 2012. ISBN 978-0-86534-883-7. Archived from the original on July 31, 2014.
- This Could Be Important: My Life and Times with the Artificial Intelligentsia. Carnegie Mellon University: ETC Press. 2019. ISBN 978-0-359-90134-0. (web edition; EPUB)

With Edward Feigenbaum

- The Fifth Generation: Artificial Intelligence and Japan's Computer Challenge to the World. Reading, Mass.: Michael Joseph. 1983. doi:10.1145/984540.984547. ISBN 0-201-11519-0.

With Nancy Ramsey

- The Futures of Women: Scenarios for the 21st Century. New York: Warner Books. 1997. ISBN 0-446-67337-4. Archived from the original on September 24, 2008.
