= Odlyzko–Schönhage algorithm =

Evaluates the Riemann zeta function at many points

In mathematics, the Odlyzko–Schönhage algorithm is a fast algorithm for evaluating the Riemann zeta function at many points, introduced by (Odlyzko & Schönhage 1988). The main point is the use of the fast Fourier transform to speed up the evaluation of a finite Dirichlet series of length N at O(N) equally spaced values from O(N^{2}) to O(N^{1+ε}) steps (at the cost of storing O(N^{1+ε}) intermediate values). The Riemann–Siegel formula used for calculating the Riemann zeta function with imaginary part T uses a finite Dirichlet series with about N = T^{1/2} terms, so when finding about N values of the Riemann zeta function it is sped up by a factor of about T^{1/2}. This reduces the time to find the zeros of the zeta function with imaginary part at most T from about T^{3/2+ε} steps to about T^{1+ε} steps.

The algorithm can be used not just for the Riemann zeta function, but also for many other functions given by Dirichlet series.

The algorithm was used by Gourdon (2004) to verify the Riemann hypothesis for the first 10^{13} zeros of the zeta function.
