= Arnold Schönhage =

German mathematician and computer scientist

Professor Arnold Schönhage
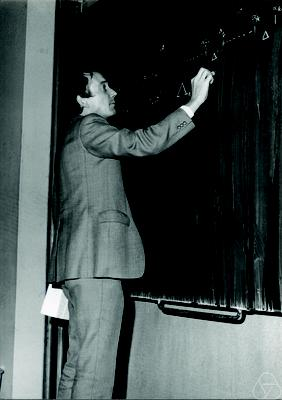
- Schönhage in 1973
- Born: December 1, 1934 (age 91); Bad Salzuflen, Germany
- Education: University of Cologne
- Known for: Schönhage–Strassen algorithm, Odlyzko–Schönhage algorithm, Schönhage's Storage Modification Machine (SMM) model. Splitting circle method.
- Scientific career
- Fields: Mathematics
- Workplaces: University of Konstanz, University of Tübingen, Rheinische Friedrich-Wilhelms-Universität, Bonn
- Doctoral advisor: Guido Hoheisel

Arnold Schönhage (born 1 December 1934 in Lockhausen, now Bad Salzuflen) is a German mathematician and computer scientist.

Schönhage was professor at the Rheinische Friedrich-Wilhelms-Universität, Bonn, and also in Tübingen and Konstanz.

Together with Volker Strassen, he developed the Schönhage–Strassen algorithm for the multiplication of large numbers that has a runtime of O(N log N log log N). For many years, this was the fastest known way to multiply large integers, although Schönhage and Strassen predicted that an algorithm with a run-time of N(logN) should exist. In 2019, Joris van der Hoeven and David Harvey finally developed an algorithm with this runtime, proving that Schönhage's and Strassen's prediction had been correct.

Schönhage designed and implemented together with Andreas F. W. Grotefeld and Ekkehart Vetter a multitape Turing machine, called TP, in software. The machine is programmed in TPAL, an assembler language. They implemented numerous numerical algorithms, including the Schönhage–Strassen algorithm, on this machine.

The Odlyzko–Schönhage algorithm from 1988 is regularly used in research on the Riemann zeta function.
