= MPSolve =

Software for approximating the roots of a polynomial with arbitrarily high precision

- Original authors: Dario Bini, Giuseppe Fiorentino, and Leonardo Robol
- Stable release: Version 3.1.5 / April 2017
- Written in: C
- Operating system: Linux, Windows, Mac OS X
- Platform: PC
- Available in: English
- Type: Mathematical software
- License: GPLv3
- Website: numpi.dm.unipi.it/software/mpsolve

MPSolve (Multiprecision Polynomial Solver) is a package for the approximation of the roots of a univariate polynomial. It uses the Aberth method, combined with a careful use of multiprecision.

"Mpsolve takes advantage of sparsity, and has special hooks for polynomials that can be evaluated efficiently by straight-line programs"

== Implementation ==
The program is written mostly in ANSI C and makes use of the GNU Multi-Precision Library. It uses a command-line interface (CLI) and, starting from version 3.1.0 has also a GUI and interfaces for MATLAB and GNU/Octave.

== Usage ==
The executable program of the package is called mpsolve. It can be run from command line in console. The executable file for the graphical user interface is called xmpsolve, and the MATLAB and Octave functions are called mps_roots. They behave similarly to the function roots that is already included in these software packages.

== Output ==
Typically output will be on the screen. It may also be saved as a text file (with res extension) and plotted in gnuplot. Direct plotting in gnuplot is also supported on Unix systems.

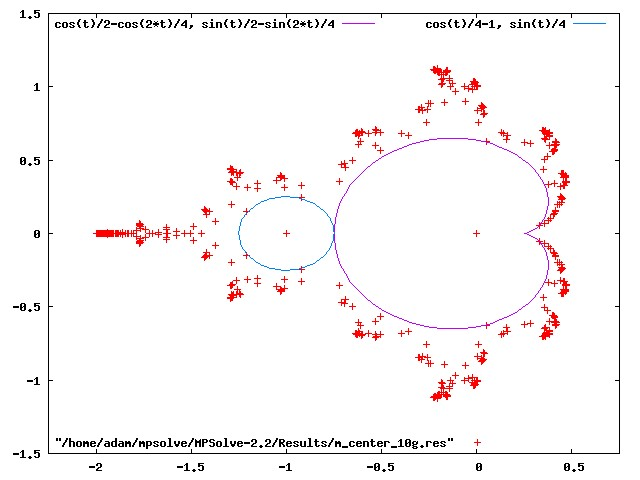

== See also ==
- Polynomial root-finding algorithms
