= Arthur Bairstow =

English cricketer

Arthur Bairstow (14 August 1868 – 7 December 1945) was an English first-class cricketer, who played twenty six first-class cricket matches between 1896 and 1902, mainly for Yorkshire County Cricket Club. A specialist wicket-keeper, he took 41 catches and completed 18 stumpings. He was less talented as a right-handed batsman, often batting at number eleven, scoring 79 runs in total at an average of 5.64 and a best of 12.

Bairstow was born in Great Horton, Bradford, England. In addition to his Yorkshire career for which he was capped and which lasted from 1896 to 1900, he played for the North of England against the South of England, in the then annual North v South match in 1897, and for an England XI against the touring Australians in 1902, a match in which Victor Trumper scored a century. He also played for Major Shaw's XI in 1906, and for the Yorkshire Council in 1920, at the age of 52, both matches against Yorkshire's Second XI. He played for Yorkshire in a rain ruined fixture against the touring Philadelphians in 1897.

He died in December 1945 in Bucklow Hill, Cheshire, aged 77.
