= Leonard Bairstow =

English aeronautical engineer

Sir Leonard Bairstow
- Bairstow in 1921
- Born: 25 June 1880; Halifax, Yorkshire, England
- Died: 8 September 1963 (aged 83); Winchester, Hampshire, England
- Education: Royal College of Science
- Awards: Fellow of the Royal Society
- Scientific career
- Workplaces: National Physical Laboratory

Sir Leonard Bairstow CBE FRS FRAeS (25 June 1880 – 8 September 1963) was an English aeronautical engineer. Bairstow is best remembered for his work in aviation and for Bairstow's method for arbitrarily finding the roots of polynomials.

== Early life and education ==
Bairstow was born in Halifax, Yorkshire, the son of Uriah Bairstow, a wealthy and keen mathematician. As a boy, Leonard went to Queens Road and Moorside Council Schools before going to Heath Grammar School which he attended briefly before going to the Council Secondary School - then known as the Higher Grade School. A scholarship took him to the Royal College of Science where he secured a Whitworth Scholarship which enabled him to carry out research into explosion of gases.

== Career ==
He then went to the National Physical Laboratory at Bushy Park where ultimately he became head of aeroplane research work. He made a major analytical contribution to the report of the R101 inquiry, which sought to discover how the airship disaster occurred. He held the Zaharoff Chair of Aviation at Imperial College London from 1920-1949 and became Professor Sir Leonard Bairstow. For a time his assistant there was Beatrice Mabel Cave-Browne-Cave, a pioneer in the mathematics of aeronautics.

== Awards and honours ==
He became a member of the Royal Society of London and the Royal Aeronautical Society.
