= Complex conjugate root theorem =

Theorem about polynomials

In mathematics, the complex conjugate root theorem states that if P is a polynomial in one variable with real coefficients, and a + bi is a root of P with a and b being real numbers, then its complex conjugate a − bi is also a root of P.

It follows from this (and the fundamental theorem of algebra) that, if the degree of a real polynomial is odd, it must have at least one real root. That fact can also be proved by using the intermediate value theorem.

== Examples and consequences ==
- The polynomial $x^2 + 1 = 0$ has two imaginary roots: $\pm i$
- Any real square matrix of odd degree has at least one real eigenvalue. For example, if the matrix is orthogonal, then 1 or −1 is an eigenvalue.
- The polynomial

$$x^3 - 7x^2 + 41x - 87$$

has roots of

$$3,\, 2 + 5i,\, 2 - 5i,$$

and thus can be factored as

$$(x - 3)(x - 2 - 5i)(x - 2 + 5i).$$

In computing the product of the last two factors, the imaginary parts cancel, and we get

$$(x - 3)(x^2 - 4x + 29).$$

The non-real factors come in pairs which when multiplied give quadratic polynomials with real coefficients. Since every polynomial with complex coefficients can be factored into 1st-degree factors (that is one way of stating the fundamental theorem of algebra), it follows that every polynomial with real coefficients can be factored into factors of degree no higher than 2: just 1st-degree and quadratic factors.

- If the roots are a+bi and a−bi, they form a quadratic

$$x^2 - 2ax + (a^2 + b^2)$$.

If the third root is c, this becomes

$$(x^2 - 2ax + (a^2 + b^2))(x-c)$$
$$=x^3 + x^2(-2a-c) + x(2ac+a^2+b^2) - c(a^2 + b^2)$$.

=== Corollary on odd-degree polynomials ===
It follows from the present theorem and the fundamental theorem of algebra that if the degree of a real polynomial is odd, it must have at least one real root.

This can be proved as follows.

- Since non-real complex roots come in conjugate pairs, there are an even number of them;
- But a polynomial of odd degree has an odd number of roots (fundamental theorem of algebra);
- Therefore, some of them must be real.

This requires some care in the presence of multiple roots; but a complex root and its conjugate do have the same multiplicity (and this lemma is not hard to prove). It can also be worked around by considering only irreducible polynomials; any real polynomial of odd degree must have an irreducible factor of odd degree, which (having no multiple roots) must have a real root by the reasoning above.

This corollary can also be proved directly by using the intermediate value theorem.

== Proof ==
One proof of the theorem is as follows:

Consider the polynomial

$$P(z) = a_0 + a_1z + a_2z^2 + \cdots + a_nz^n$$

where all a_{r} are real. Suppose some complex number ζ is a root of P, that is $P(\zeta) = 0$. It needs to be shown that

$$P\big(\, \overline{\zeta} \,\big) = 0$$

as well.

If P(ζ ) = 0, then

$$a_0 + a_1\zeta + a_2\zeta^2 + \cdots + a_n\zeta^n = 0$$

which can be put as

$$\sum_{r=0}^n a_r\zeta^r = 0.$$

Now

$$P\big(\, \overline{\zeta} \,\big) = \sum_{r=0}^n a_r \big(\, \overline{\zeta} \,\big)^r$$

and given the properties of complex conjugation,

$$\sum_{r=0}^n a_r\big(\, \overline{\zeta} \,\big)^r = \sum_{r=0}^n a_r \overline{\zeta^r} = \sum_{r=0}^n \overline{a_r\zeta^r} = \overline{\sum_{r=0}^n a_r\zeta^r}.$$

Since

$$\overline{\sum_{r=0}^n a_r\zeta^r} = \overline{0},$$

it follows that

$$\sum_{r=0}^n a_r\big(\, \overline{\zeta} \,\big)^r = \overline{0} = 0.$$

That is,

$$P\big(\, \overline{\zeta} \,\big) = a_0 + a_1\overline{\zeta} + a_2\big(\, \overline{\zeta} \,\big)^2 + \cdots + a_n\big(\, \overline{\zeta} \,\big)^n = 0.$$

Note that this works only because the a_{r} are real, that is, $\overline{a_r} = a_r$. If any of the coefficients were non-real, the roots would not necessarily come in conjugate pairs. In addition, one can show that for any $\zeta \in \mathbb{C}$, it holds that $P(\overline{\zeta})=\overline{P(\zeta)}$ even if $P(\zeta) \neq 0$.
