= Time-inhomogeneous hidden Bernoulli model =

Model used in speech recognition

Time-inhomogeneous hidden Bernoulli model (TI-HBM) is an alternative to hidden Markov model (HMM) for automatic speech recognition. Contrary to HMM, the state transition process in TI-HBM is not a Markov-dependent process, rather it is a generalized Bernoulli (an independent) process. This difference leads to elimination of dynamic programming at state-level in TI-HBM decoding process. Thus, the computational complexity of TI-HBM for probability evaluation and state estimation is $O(NL)$ (instead of $O(N^2L)$ in the HMM case, where $N$ and $L$ are number of states and observation sequence length respectively). The TI-HBM is able to model acoustic-unit duration (e.g. phone/word duration) by using a built-in parameter named survival probability. The TI-HBM is simpler and faster than HMM in a phoneme recognition task, but its performance is comparable to HMM.

For details, see or .
