= Jenkins–Traub algorithm =

Root-finding algorithm for polynomials

The Jenkins–Traub algorithm for polynomial zeros is a fast globally convergent iterative polynomial root-finding method published in 1970 by Michael A. Jenkins and Joseph F. Traub. They gave two variants, one for general polynomials with complex coefficients, commonly known as the "CPOLY" algorithm, and a more complicated variant for the special case of polynomials with real coefficients, commonly known as the "RPOLY" algorithm. The latter is "practically a standard in black-box polynomial root-finders".

This article describes the complex variant. Given a polynomial P,
$$P(z) = \sum_{i=0}^na_iz^{n-i}, \quad a_0=1,\quad a_n\ne 0$$
with complex coefficients it computes approximations to the n zeros $\alpha_1,\alpha_2,\dots,\alpha_n$ of P(z), one at a time in roughly increasing order of magnitude. After each root is computed, its linear factor is removed from the polynomial. Using this deflation guarantees that each root is computed only once and that all roots are found.

The real variant follows the same pattern, but computes two roots at a time, either two real roots or a pair of conjugate complex roots. By avoiding complex arithmetic, the real variant can be faster (by a factor of 4) than the complex variant. The Jenkins–Traub algorithm has stimulated considerable research on theory and software for methods of this type.

== Overview ==
The Jenkins–Traub algorithm calculates all of the roots of a polynomial with complex coefficients. The algorithm starts by checking the polynomial for the occurrence of very large or very small roots. If necessary, the coefficients are rescaled by a rescaling of the variable. In the algorithm, proper roots are found one by one and generally in increasing size. After each root is found, the polynomial is deflated by dividing off the corresponding linear factor. Indeed, the factorization of the polynomial into the linear factor and the remaining deflated polynomial is already a result of the root-finding procedure. The root-finding procedure has three stages that correspond to different variants of the inverse power iteration. See Jenkins and Traub. A description can also be found in Ralston and Rabinowitz p. 383. The algorithm is similar in spirit to the two-stage algorithm studied by Traub.

=== Root-finding procedure ===
Starting with the current polynomial P(X) of degree n, the aim is to compute the smallest root $\alpha$ of P(x). The polynomial can then be split into a linear factor and the remaining polynomial factor
$$P(X)=(X-\alpha)\bar H(X)$$
Other root-finding methods strive primarily to improve the root and thus the first factor. The main idea of the Jenkins-Traub method is to incrementally improve the second factor.

To that end, a sequence of so-called H polynomials is constructed. These polynomials are all of degree n − 1 and are supposed to converge to the factor $\bar H(X)$ of P(X) containing (the linear factors of) all the remaining roots. The sequence of H polynomials occurs in two variants, an unnormalized variant that allows easy theoretical insights and a normalized variant of $\bar H$ polynomials that keeps the coefficients in a numerically sensible range. The construction of the H polynomials $\left(H^{(\lambda)}(z)\right)_{\lambda=0,1,2,\dots}$ is guided by a sequence of complex numbers $(s_\lambda)_{\lambda=0,1,2,\dots}$ called shifts. These shifts themselves depend, at least in the third stage, on the previous H polynomials. The H polynomials are defined as the solution to the implicit recursion
$$H^{(0)}(z)=P^\prime(z)$$
and
$$(X-s_\lambda)\cdot H^{(\lambda+1)}(X)\equiv H^{(\lambda)}(X)\pmod{P(X)}\ .$$
A direct solution to this implicit equation is
$$H^{(\lambda+1)}(X)
=\frac1{X-s_\lambda}\cdot
\left(
H^{(\lambda)}(X)-\frac{H^{(\lambda)}(s_\lambda)}{P(s_\lambda)}P(X)
\right)\,,$$
where the polynomial division is exact.

Algorithmically, one would use long division by the linear factor as in the Horner scheme or Ruffini rule to evaluate the polynomials at $s_\lambda$ and obtain the quotients at the same time. With the resulting quotients p(X) and h(X) as intermediate results the next H polynomial is obtained as
$$\left.\begin{align}
P(X)&=p(X)\cdot(X-s_\lambda)+P(s_\lambda)\\
H^{(\lambda)}(X)&=h(X)\cdot(X-s_\lambda)+H^{(\lambda)}(s_\lambda)\\
\end{align}\right\}
\implies H^{(\lambda+1)}(z)=h(z)-\frac{H^{(\lambda)}(s_\lambda)}{P(s_\lambda)}p(z).$$
Since the highest degree coefficient is obtained from P(X), the leading coefficient of $H^{(\lambda+1)}(X)$ is $-\tfrac{H^{(\lambda)}(s_\lambda)}{P(s_\lambda)}$. If this is divided out the normalized H polynomial is
$$\begin{align}
\bar H^{(\lambda+1)}(X)
&=\frac1{X-s_\lambda}\cdot
\left(
P(X)-\frac{P(s_\lambda)}{H^{(\lambda)}(s_\lambda)}H^{(\lambda)}(X)
\right)\\[1em]
&=\frac1{X-s_\lambda}\cdot
\left(
P(X)-\frac{P(s_\lambda)}{\bar H^{(\lambda)}(s_\lambda)}\bar H^{(\lambda)}(X)
\right)\,.\end{align}$$

==== Stage one: no-shift process ====
For $\lambda = 0,1,\dots, M-1$ set $s_\lambda=0$. Usually M=5 is chosen for polynomials of moderate degrees up to n = 50. This stage is not necessary from theoretical considerations alone, but is useful in practice. It emphasizes in the H polynomials the cofactor(s) (of the linear factor) of the smallest root(s).

==== Stage two: fixed-shift process ====
The shift for this stage is determined as some point close to the smallest root of the polynomial. It is quasi-randomly located on the circle with the inner root radius, which in turn is estimated as the positive solution of the equation
$$R^n+|a_{n-1}|\,R^{n-1}+\dots+|a_{1}|\,R=|a_0|\,.$$
Since the left side is a convex function and increases monotonically from zero to infinity, this equation is easy to solve, for instance by Newton's method.

Now choose $s=R\cdot \exp(i\,\phi_\text{random})$ on the circle of this radius. The sequence of polynomials $H^{(\lambda+1)}(z)$, $\lambda=M,M+1,\dots,L-1$, is generated with the fixed shift value $s_\lambda = s$. This creates an asymmetry relative to the previous stage which increases the chance that the H polynomial moves towards the cofactor of a single root. During this iteration, the current approximation for the root

$$t_\lambda=s-\frac{P(s)}{\bar H^{(\lambda)}(s)}$$
is traced. The second stage is terminated as successful if the conditions
$$|t_{\lambda+1}-t_\lambda|<\tfrac12\,|t_\lambda|$$
and
$$|t_\lambda-t_{\lambda-1}|<\tfrac12\,|t_{\lambda-1}|$$
are simultaneously met. This limits the relative step size of the iteration, ensuring that the approximation sequence stays in the range of the smaller roots. If there was no success after some number of iterations, a different random point on the circle is tried. Typically one uses a number of 9 iterations for polynomials of moderate degree, with a doubling strategy for the case of multiple failures.

==== Stage three: variable-shift process ====
The $H^{(\lambda+1)}(X)$ polynomials are now generated using the variable shifts $s_{\lambda},\quad\lambda=L,L+1,\dots$ which are generated by
$$s_L = t_L = s- \frac{P(s)}{\bar H^{(L)}(s)}$$
being the last root estimate of the second stage and
$$s_{\lambda+1}=s_\lambda- \frac{P(s_\lambda)}{\bar H^{(\lambda+1)}(s_\lambda)}, \quad \lambda=L,L+1,\dots,$$
where $\bar H^{(\lambda+1)}(z)$ is the normalized H polynomial, that is $H^{(\lambda)}(z)$ divided by its leading coefficient.

If the step size in stage three does not fall fast enough to zero, then stage two is restarted using a different random point. If this does not succeed after a small number of restarts, the number of steps in stage two is doubled.

==== Convergence ====
It can be shown that, provided L is chosen sufficiently large, s_{λ} always converges to a root of P.

The algorithm converges for any distribution of roots, but may fail to find all roots of the polynomial. Furthermore, the convergence is slightly faster than the quadratic convergence of the Newton–Raphson method, however, it uses one-and-half as many operations per step, two polynomial evaluations for Newton vs. three polynomial evaluations in the third stage.

== What gives the algorithm its power? ==
Compare with the Newton–Raphson iteration
$$z_{i+1}=z_i - \frac{P(z_i)}{P^{\prime}(z_i)}.$$

The iteration uses the given P and $\scriptstyle P^{\prime}$. In contrast the third-stage of Jenkins–Traub
$$s_{\lambda+1}
=s_\lambda- \frac{P(s_\lambda)}{\bar H^{\lambda+1}(s_\lambda)}
=s_\lambda-\frac{W^\lambda(s_\lambda)}{(W^\lambda)'(s_\lambda)}$$

is precisely a Newton–Raphson iteration performed on certain rational functions. More precisely, Newton–Raphson is being performed on a sequence of rational functions
$$W^\lambda(z)=\frac{P(z)}{H^\lambda(z)}.$$

For $\lambda$ sufficiently large,
$$\frac{P(z)}{\bar H^{\lambda}(z)}=W^\lambda(z)\,LC(H^{\lambda})$$
is as close as desired to a first degree polynomial
$$z-\alpha_1, \,$$
where $\alpha_1$ is one of the zeros of $P$. Even though Stage 3 is precisely a Newton–Raphson iteration, differentiation is not performed.

=== Analysis of the H polynomials ===
Let $\alpha_1,\dots,\alpha_n$ be the roots of P(X). The so-called Lagrange factors of P(X) are the cofactors of these roots,
$$P_m(X)=\frac{P(X)-P(\alpha_m)}{X-\alpha_m}.$$
If all roots are different, then the Lagrange factors form a basis of the space of polynomials of degree at most n − 1. By analysis of the recursion procedure one finds that the H polynomials have the coordinate representation
$$H^{(\lambda)}(X)
=\sum_{m=1}^n
\left[
\prod_{\kappa=0}^{\lambda-1}(\alpha_m-s_\kappa)
\right]^{-1}\,P_m(X)\ .$$
Each Lagrange factor has leading coefficient 1, so that the leading coefficient of the H polynomials is the sum of the coefficients. The normalized H polynomials are thus
$$\bar H^{(\lambda)}(X)
=\frac{\sum_{m=1}^n
\left[
\prod_{\kappa=0}^{\lambda-1}(\alpha_m-s_\kappa)
\right]^{-1}\,P_m(X)
}{
\sum_{m=1}^n
\left[
\prod_{\kappa=0}^{\lambda-1}(\alpha_m-s_\kappa)
\right]^{-1}
}
= \frac{P_1(X)+\sum_{m=2}^n
\left[
\prod_{\kappa=0}^{\lambda-1}\frac{\alpha_1-s_\kappa}{\alpha_m-s_\kappa}
\right]\,P_m(X)
}{
1+\sum_{m=1}^n
\left[
\prod_{\kappa=0}^{\lambda-1}\frac{\alpha_1-s_\kappa}{\alpha_m-s_\kappa}
\right]
}\ .$$

=== Convergence orders ===
If the condition $|\alpha_1-s_\kappa|<\min{}_{m=2,3,\dots,n}|\alpha_m-s_\kappa|$ holds for almost all iterates, the normalized H polynomials will converge at least geometrically towards $P_1(X)$.

Under the condition that
$$|\alpha_1|<|\alpha_2|=\min{}_{m=2,3,\dots,n}|\alpha_m|$$
one gets the asymptotic estimates for

- stage 1:
  $$H^{(\lambda)}(X)
=P_1(X)+O\left(\left|\frac{\alpha_1}{\alpha_2}\right|^\lambda\right).$$
- for stage 2, if s is close enough to $\alpha_1$:
  $$H^{(\lambda)}(X)
= P_1(X)
+O\left(
\left|\frac{\alpha_1}{\alpha_2}\right|^M
\cdot
\left|\frac{\alpha_1-s}{\alpha_2-s}\right|^{\lambda-M}\right)$$
  and
  $$s-\frac{P(s)}{\bar H^{(\lambda)}(s)}
= \alpha_1+O\left(\ldots\cdot|\alpha_1-s|\right).$$
- and for stage 3:
  $$H^{(\lambda)}(X)
=P_1(X)
+O\left(\prod_{\kappa=0}^{\lambda-1}
\left|\frac{\alpha_1-s_\kappa}{\alpha_2-s_\kappa}\right|
\right)$$
  and
  $$s_{\lambda+1}=
s_\lambda-\frac{P(s)}{\bar H^{(\lambda+1)}(s_\lambda)}
=\alpha_1+O\left(\prod_{\kappa=0}^{\lambda-1}
\left|\frac{\alpha_1-s_\kappa}{\alpha_2-s_\kappa}\right|
\cdot
\frac{|\alpha_1-s_\lambda|^2}{|\alpha_2-s_\lambda|}
\right)$$
  giving rise to a higher than quadratic convergence order of $\phi^2=1+\phi\approx 2.618$, where $\phi=\tfrac12(1+\sqrt5)$ is the golden ratio.

=== Interpretation as inverse power iteration ===
All stages of the Jenkins–Traub complex algorithm may be represented as the linear algebra problem of determining the eigenvalues of a special matrix. This matrix is the coordinate representation of a linear map in the n-dimensional space of polynomials of degree n − 1 or less. The principal idea of this map is to interpret the factorization
$$P(X)=(X-\alpha_1)\cdot P_1(X)$$
with a root $\alpha_1\in\C$ and $P_1(X) = P(X) / (X-\alpha_1)$ the remaining factor of degree n − 1 as the eigenvector equation for the multiplication with the variable X, followed by remainder computation with divisor P(X),
$$M_X(H) = (X\cdot H(X)) \bmod P(X)\,.$$
This maps polynomials of degree at most n − 1 to polynomials of degree at most n − 1. The eigenvalues of this map are the roots of P(X), since the eigenvector equation reads
$$0 = (M_X-\alpha\cdot id)(H)=((X-\alpha)\cdot H) \bmod P\,,$$
which implies that $(X-\alpha)\cdot H=C\cdot P(X)$, that is, $(X-\alpha)$ is a linear factor of P(X). In the monomial basis the linear map $M_X$ is represented by a companion matrix of the polynomial P, as
$$M_X(H) = \sum_{m=0}^{n-1}H_mX^{m+1}-H_{n-1}\left(X^n+\sum_{m=0}^{n-1}a_mX^m\right) = \sum_{m=1}^{n-1}(H_{m-1}-a_{m}H_{n-1})X^m-a_0H_{n-1}\,,$$
the resulting transformation matrix is
$$A=\begin{pmatrix}
0 & 0 & \dots & 0 & -a_0 \\
1 & 0 & \dots & 0 & -a_1 \\
0 & 1 & \dots & 0 & -a_2 \\
\vdots & \vdots & \ddots & \vdots & \vdots \\
0 & 0 & \dots & 1 & -a_{n-1}
\end{pmatrix}\,.$$
To this matrix the inverse power iteration is applied in the three variants of no shift, constant shift and generalized Rayleigh shift in the three stages of the algorithm. It is more efficient to perform the linear algebra operations in polynomial arithmetic and not by matrix operations, however, the properties of the inverse power iteration remain the same.

== Real coefficients ==
The Jenkins–Traub algorithm described earlier works for polynomials with complex coefficients. The same authors also created a three-stage algorithm for polynomials with real coefficients. See Jenkins and Traub A Three-Stage Algorithm for Real Polynomials Using Quadratic Iteration. The algorithm finds either a linear or quadratic factor working completely in real arithmetic. If the complex and real algorithms are applied to the same real polynomial, the real algorithm is about four times as fast. The real algorithm always converges and the rate of convergence is greater than second order.

== A connection with the shifted QR algorithm ==
There is a surprising connection with the shifted QR algorithm for computing matrix eigenvalues. See Dekker and Traub The shifted QR algorithm for Hermitian matrices. Again the shifts may be viewed as Newton-Raphson iteration on a sequence of rational functions converging to a first degree polynomial.

== Software and testing ==
The software for the Jenkins–Traub algorithm was published as Jenkins and Traub Algorithm 419: Zeros of a Complex Polynomial. The software for the real algorithm was published as Jenkins Algorithm 493: Zeros of a Real Polynomial.

The methods have been extensively tested by many people. As predicted they enjoy faster than quadratic convergence for all distributions of zeros.

However, there are polynomials which can cause loss of precision as illustrated by the following example. The polynomial has all its zeros lying on two half-circles of different radii. Wilkinson recommends that it is desirable for stable deflation that smaller zeros be computed first. The second-stage shifts are chosen so that the zeros on the smaller half circle are found first. After deflation the polynomial with the zeros on the half circle is known to be ill-conditioned if the degree is large; see Wilkinson, p. 64. The original polynomial was of degree 60 and suffered severe deflation instability.
