= List of mathematics-based methods =

This is a list of mathematics-based methods.

- Adams' method (differential equations)
- Akra–Bazzi method (asymptotic analysis)
- Bisection method (root finding)
- Brent's method (root finding)
- Condorcet method (voting systems)
- Coombs' method (voting systems)
- Copeland's method (voting systems)
- Crank–Nicolson method (numerical analysis)
- D'Hondt method (voting systems)
- D21 – Janeček method (voting system)
- Discrete element method (numerical analysis)
- Domain decomposition method (numerical analysis)
- Epidemiological methods
- Euler's forward method
- Explicit and implicit methods (numerical analysis)
- Finite difference method (numerical analysis)
- Finite element method (numerical analysis)
- Finite volume method (numerical analysis)
- Highest averages method (voting systems)
- Method of exhaustion
- Method of infinite descent (number theory)
- Information bottleneck method
- Inverse chain rule method (calculus)
- Inverse transform sampling method (probability)
- Iterative method (numerical analysis)
- Jacobi method (linear algebra)
- Largest remainder method (voting systems)
- Level-set method
- Linear combination of atomic orbitals molecular orbital method (molecular orbitals)
- Method of characteristics
- Least squares method (optimization, statistics)
- Maximum likelihood method (statistics)
- Method of complements (arithmetic)
- Method of moving frames (differential geometry)
- Method of successive substitution (number theory)
- Monte Carlo method (computational physics, simulation)
- Newton's method (numerical analysis)
- Pemdas method (order of operation)
- Perturbation methods (functional analysis, quantum theory)
- Probabilistic method (combinatorics)
- Romberg's method (numerical analysis)
- Runge–Kutta method (numerical analysis)
- Sainte-Laguë method (voting systems)
- Schulze method (voting systems)
- Sequential Monte Carlo method
- Simplex method
- Spectral method (numerical analysis)
- Variational methods (mathematical analysis, differential equations)
- Welch's method

== See also ==
- Automatic basis function construction
- List of graphical methods
- Scientific method
