= Sidi's generalized secant method =

Sidi's generalized secant method is a root-finding algorithm, that is, a numerical method for solving equations of the form $f(x)=0$ . The method was published by Avram Sidi.

The method is a generalization of the secant method. Like the secant method, it is an iterative method which requires one evaluation of $f$ in each iteration and no derivatives of $f$. The method can converge much faster though, with an order which approaches 2 provided that $f$ satisfies the regularity conditions described below.

== Algorithm ==
We call $\alpha$ the root of $f$, that is, $f(\alpha)=0$. Sidi's method is an iterative method which generates a sequence $\{ x_i \}$ of approximations of $\alpha$. Starting with k + 1 initial approximations $x_1 , \dots , x_{k+1}$, the approximation $x_{k+2}$ is calculated in the first iteration, the approximation $x_{k+3}$ is calculated in the second iteration, etc. Each iteration takes as input the last k + 1 approximations and the value of $f$ at those approximations. Hence the nth iteration takes as input the approximations $x_n , \dots , x_{n+k}$ and the values $f(x_n) , \dots , f(x_{n+k})$.

The number k must be 1 or larger: k = 1, 2, 3, .... It remains fixed during the execution of the algorithm. In order to obtain the starting approximations $x_1 , \dots , x_{k+1}$ one could carry out a few initializing iterations with a lower value of k.

The approximation $x_{n+k+1}$ is calculated as follows in the nth iteration. A polynomial of interpolation $p_{n,k} (x)$ of degree k is fitted to the k + 1 points $(x_n, f(x_n)), \dots (x_{n+k}, f(x_{n+k}))$. With this polynomial, the next approximation $x_{n+k+1}$ of $\alpha$ is calculated as

$x_{n+k+1} = x_{n+k} - \frac{f(x_{n+k})}{p_{n,k}'(x_{n+k})}$	1

with $p_{n,k}'(x_{n+k})$ the derivative of $p_{n,k}$ at $x_{n+k}$. Having calculated $x_{n+k+1}$ one calculates $f(x_{n+k+1})$ and the algorithm can continue with the (n + 1)th iteration. Clearly, this method requires the function $f$ to be evaluated only once per iteration; it requires no derivatives of $f$.

The iterative cycle is stopped if an appropriate stopping criterion is met. Typically the criterion is that the last calculated approximation is close enough to the sought-after root $\alpha$.

To execute the algorithm effectively, Sidi's method calculates the interpolating polynomial $p_{n,k} (x)$ in its Newton form.

== Convergence ==
Sidi showed that if the function $f$ is (k + 1)-times continuously differentiable in an open interval $I$ containing $\alpha$ (that is, $f \in C^{k+1} (I)$), $\alpha$ is a simple root of $f$ (that is, $f'(\alpha) \neq 0$) and the initial approximations $x_1 , \dots , x_{k+1}$ are chosen close enough to $\alpha$, then the sequence $\{ x_i \}$ converges to $\alpha$, meaning that the following limit holds: $\lim\limits_{n \to \infty} x_n = \alpha$.

Sidi furthermore showed that

$$\lim_{n\to\infty} \frac{x_{n +1}-\alpha}{\prod^k_{i=0}(x_{n-i}-\alpha)} = L = \frac{(-1)^{k+1}} {(k+1)!}\frac{f^{(k+1)}(\alpha)}{f'(\alpha)},$$

and that the sequence converges to $\alpha$ of order $\psi_k$, i.e.

$$\lim\limits_{n \to \infty} \frac{|x_{n+1}-\alpha|}{|x_n-\alpha|^{\psi_k}} = |L|^{(\psi_k-1)/k}$$

The order of convergence $\psi_k$ is the only positive root of the polynomial

$$s^{k+1} - s^k - s^{k-1} - \dots - s - 1$$

We have e.g. $\psi_1 = (1+\sqrt{5})/2$ ≈ 1.6180, $\psi_2$ ≈ 1.8393 and $\psi_3$ ≈ 1.9276. The order approaches 2 from below if k becomes large: $\lim\limits_{k \to \infty} \psi_k = 2$

== Related algorithms ==
Sidi's method reduces to the secant method if we take k = 1. In this case the polynomial $p_{n,1} (x)$ is the linear approximation of $f$ around $\alpha$ which is used in the nth iteration of the secant method.

We can expect that the larger we choose k, the better $p_{n,k} (x)$ is an approximation of $f(x)$ around $x=\alpha$. Also, the better $p_{n,k}' (x)$ is an approximation of $f'(x)$ around $x=\alpha$. If we replace $p_{n,k}'$ with $f'$ in (1) we obtain that the next approximation in each iteration is calculated as

$x_{n+k+1} = x_{n+k} - \frac{f(x_{n+k})}{f'(x_{n+k})}$	2

This is the Newton–Raphson method. It starts off with a single approximation $x_1$ so we can take k = 0 in (2). It does not require an interpolating polynomial but instead one has to evaluate the derivative $f'$ in each iteration. Depending on the nature of $f$ this may not be possible or practical.

Once the interpolating polynomial $p_{n,k} (x)$ has been calculated, one can also calculate the next approximation $x_{n+k+1}$ as a solution of $p_{n,k} (x)=0$ instead of using (1). For k = 1 these two methods are identical: it is the secant method. For k = 2 this method is known as Muller's method. For k = 3 this approach involves finding the roots of a cubic function, which is unattractively complicated. This problem becomes worse for even larger values of k. An additional complication is that the equation $p_{n,k} (x)=0$ will in general have multiple solutions and a prescription has to be given which of these solutions is the next approximation $x_{n+k+1}$. Muller does this for the case k = 2 but no such prescriptions appear to exist for k > 2.
