= Inverse quadratic interpolation =

Method of solving equations

In numerical analysis, inverse quadratic interpolation is a root-finding algorithm, meaning that it is an algorithm for solving equations of the form f(x) = 0. The idea is to use quadratic interpolation to approximate the inverse of f. This algorithm is rarely used on its own, but it is important because it forms part of the popular Brent's method.

== The method ==
The inverse quadratic interpolation algorithm is defined by the recurrence relation

$$x_{n+1} = \frac{f_{n-1}f_n}{(f_{n-2}-f_{n-1})(f_{n-2}-f_n)} x_{n-2} + \frac{f_{n-2}f_n}{(f_{n-1}-f_{n-2})(f_{n-1}-f_n)} x_{n-1}$$

$${} + \frac{f_{n-2}f_{n-1}}{(f_n-f_{n-2})(f_n-f_{n-1})} x_n,$$

where f_{k} = f(x_{k}). As can be seen from the recurrence relation, this method requires three initial values, x_{0}, x_{1} and x_{2}.

== Explanation of the method ==
We use the three preceding iterates, x_{n−2}, x_{n−1} and x_{n}, with their function values, f_{n−2}, f_{n−1} and f_{n}. Applying the Lagrange interpolation formula to do quadratic interpolation on the inverse of f yields

$$f^{-1}(y) = \frac{(y-f_{n-1})(y-f_n)}{(f_{n-2}-f_{n-1})(f_{n-2}-f_n)} x_{n-2} + \frac{(y-f_{n-2})(y-f_n)}{(f_{n-1}-f_{n-2})(f_{n-1}-f_n)} x_{n-1}$$

$$\qquad + \frac{(y-f_{n-2})(y-f_{n-1})}{(f_n-f_{n-2})(f_n-f_{n-1})} x_n.$$

We are looking for a root of f, so we substitute y = f(x) = 0 in the above equation, and this results in the above recursion formula.

== Behaviour ==
The asymptotic behaviour is very good: generally, the iterates x_{n} converge fast to the root once they get close. However, performance is often quite poor if the initial values are not close to the actual root. For instance, if by any chance two of the function values f_{n−2}, f_{n−1} and f_{n} coincide, the algorithm fails completely. Thus, inverse quadratic interpolation is seldom used as a stand-alone algorithm.

The order of this convergence is approximately 1.84 as can be proved by secant method analysis.

== Comparison with other root-finding methods ==
As noted in the introduction, inverse quadratic interpolation is used in Brent's method.

Inverse quadratic interpolation is also closely related to some other root-finding methods. Using linear interpolation instead of quadratic interpolation gives the secant method. Interpolating f instead of the inverse of f gives Muller's method.

== See also ==
- Successive parabolic interpolation is a related method that uses parabolas to find extrema rather than roots.
