= D21 – Janeček method =

Approval-like voting rule

The D21 method, also known as the D21 – Janeček method or Democracy 2.1, is an electoral system applicable for both single-winner and multi-winner voting, which allows voters to cast more votes than there are open seats. It is a cardinal method like approval voting and combined approval voting. The method was developed by Czech mathematician Karel Janeček.

This voting method has yet to be used in any general elections. It has been used in several participatory budgeting programs conducted by various cities.

== Background ==
The D21 method was created in 2013 in response to corruption within the Czech political system. According to Transparency International's Global Corruption Barometer in 2013, a majority of Czech citizens believed that political corruption in the country was widespread. In March 2011, Janeček founded the Endowment Fund Against Corruption (NFPK), aiming to expose prominent cases of corruption. Suggestions were made that the country's voting system needed an overhaul. The D21 method, originally formulated in 2012, was beta tested the following year.

The method was notably used in the project Prezident 21, an initiative focused on helping voters understand the 2018 Czech presidential election.

== Electoral system ==
The basic prerequisite of the D21 method is that the voter always has more votes available than the number of existing winning opportunities. All votes have the same value. The voter can, but does not have to, use all of them. Multiple votes cannot be accumulated; a candidate can receive only one vote from each voter.

The system is based on the effect of more votes, which means that voters are allowed to grant a 'plus vote' to more candidates than there are seats, unlike limited voting where voters can cast fewer votes than there are seats, and plurality-at-large where voters cast as many votes as there are seats. All votes are of the same absolute value and each candidate can only receive one vote from each voter, which distinguishes the D21 method from cumulative voting.

The number of votes is determined by the number of seats available and the number of ballot options. The total number of votes is decided based on a mathematical algorithm which takes both of these factors into account.

The following table shows the recommended vote allowances for each number of candidates:

Number of votes allowed by the D21 method
Number of winners	Number of candidates	Number of votes
1	2	1
1	3-6	2
1	7 or more	3
2	3	2
2	4-6	3
2	7 or more	4
3	4	3
3	5-7	4
3	8 or more	5
4	5	4
4	6-7	5
4	8-12	6
4	13 or more	7
5	6	5
5	7-8	6
5	9-13	7
5	14 or more	8

In some cases, voters can also use a minus vote, provided they cast at least two plus votes. Minus votes carry the same absolute value as plus votes. It is not recommended to use minus votes in political elections in societies with major internal divisions among ethnic, religious or linguistic lines. With its effect, the minus vote is designed to enhance the effect of more votes.

=== Application ===
An election uses the D21 method when:

- Each voter may vote for more candidates than the number of election winners to be decided
- Each voter can cast no more than one vote for any candidate
- Each vote has the same absolute weight; the candidate(s) receiving the greatest net sum of all votes win
- The voter can, but does not have to, use all available votes

For example, in an election to fill two seats, with six candidates competing, voters may cast up to three votes. With one seat open and six candidates, voters may cast two votes.

There exists a variant of the D21 method that includes a minus vote. Minus votes carry the same absolute value as plus votes (-1 vs +1). In such cases, voters can use a minus vote so long as they cast at least two plus votes.

=== Effects ===
The system aims to reduce the chance of populist and extremist candidates getting elected, as they would struggle to garner votes from other candidates' supporters. The fact that voters are allowed to vote for candidates of different political affiliations is expected to lead to a broader consensus by the author. It is meant to reduce strategic voting, as voters are less motivated to vote strategically when they do not have to choose between their sincere choice and the "lesser evil."

=== Example ===

Suppose that Tennessee is holding an election on the location of its capital. The population is concentrated around four major cities. All voters want the capital to be as close to them as possible. The options are:

- Memphis, the largest city, but far from the others (42% of voters)
- Nashville, near the center of the state (26% of voters)
- Chattanooga, somewhat east (15% of voters)
- Knoxville, far to the northeast (17% of voters)

The preferences of each region's voters are:

42% of voters Far-West	26% of voters Center	15% of voters Center-East	17% of voters Far-East
1. Memphis; 2. Nashville; 3. Chattanooga; 4. Knoxville	1. Nashville; 2. Chattanooga; 3. Knoxville; 4. Memphis	1. Chattanooga; 2. Knoxville; 3. Nashville; 4. Memphis	1. Knoxville; 2. Chattanooga; 3. Nashville; 4. Memphis

With the D21 method, voters are able to vote for their two top preferences - their own city and the next closest. The results would be as follows:

- Memphis: 42 total votes (42 votes from Memphis, 0 from Nashville, 0 from Chattanooga, 0 from Knoxville)
- Nashville: 68 total votes (42 votes from Memphis, 26 from Nashville, 0 from Chattanooga, 0 from Knoxville)
- Chattanooga: 58 total votes (0 votes from Memphis, 26 from Nashville, 15 from Chattanooga, 17 from Knoxville)
- Knoxville: 32 total votes (0 votes from Memphis, 0 from Nashville, 15 from Chattanooga, 17 from Knoxville)

Nashville wins.

== Official proposal ==
A proposal to implement the method in two-seat voting districts was submitted to the Czech government but was rejected. As of 2023, D21 has not been used to decide any major general elections in the country or elsewhere.

== Development ==
In 2016, Janeček founded Institute H21, initially named Institute for Democracy 21, with the objective to promote the D21 method and research it comparatively with other voting methods. The insights gained from research projects conducted by Institute H21 led to further refinements in the D21 voting method. The primary adaptation was maintaining the method as a predominantly plus vote system, with the inclusion of minus votes only in specific cases.

The system was considered for participatory budgeting experiments in Cascais, Portugal. In 2015, the D21 system was introduced to the public through a voting game Prezident 21, where people could suggest candidates for 2018 Czech presidential election, as well as vote for them with D21 voting method using three plus votes and one minus vote. More than 300,000 people in the Czech Republic have participated.

The D21 method has been employed in election polls to study the method empirically and to identify voter overlaps between candidates and parties in the Czech Republic consistently since 2015.

== Use in municipalities ==
The D21 method has been used in various Czech and Slovak municipalities to allocate public funds in participatory budgeting elections. It was first used in Říčany in March 2015, with the aim of testing and developing the new platform for municipal decisions. The objective of choosing this method was to motivate people to take interest in what was happening in their municipality. It was suggested that the system made it easier for them to get involved in making public decisions to raise general welfare and transparency of public procurements. The town allows for voting via the internet, and it has been used on several occasions since 2015.

== Criticism ==
Negative voting has been described as "ill-advised" in cases where it could be used against a religious or ethnic minority. Concerns have also been raised that the minus vote could encourage negative campaigning.

One of Janeček's main objectives with this method is to diminish extremist electoral strength. This point has been questioned by some specialists in political sciences. They claim that the existence and competitiveness of extremist parties is essential for a well functioning democracy for several reasons. It is theorized that the limitation of extremism on the political level can cause the mushrooming of the ideology in other forms. Those ways of extremism could go underground and become more difficult to monitor, making them potentially more dangerous.

The system was also criticized by the political academic Michel Perottino for its complexity compared to the proportional voting system used currently in Czech general elections, suggesting it might be difficult for voters to understand and use the new system effectively. However, an experimental presidential election in 2023 showed that voters cast fewer invalid votes in the D21 voting method than in plurality voting. On the other hand, they did make more mistakes with the conditional minus vote without invalidation the plus votes. In addition, it was argued that it would be more complicated for the administration to determine the election results.

== See also ==
- Ranked voting
- Single transferable vote
- Condorcet method
- First-past-the-post voting
- Positional voting
- Instant-runoff voting
- Party-list proportional representation
- Proportional representation
- Two-round system
- Cumulative voting
- Webster/Sainte-Laguë method
- Coombs' method
- Borda voting
- Schulze method
- List of mathematics-based methods
