= Brent's algorithm =

Brent's algorithm is either of the following:

- Brent's algorithm for cycle detection
- Brent's method for finding roots of functions of one real variable
