= Corruption in the Czech Republic =

Corruption in the Czech Republic is considered to be widespread by a majority of the Czech public, according to Transparency International’s Global Corruption Barometer 2013.

Transparency International's 2025 Corruption Perceptions Index scored the Czech Republic at 59 on a scale from 0 ("highly corrupt") to 100 ("very clean"). When ranked by score, the Czech Republic ranked 39th among the 182 countries in the Index, where the country ranked first is perceived to have the most honest public sector. For comparison with regional scores, the best score among Western European and European Union countries (Note: Austria, Belgium, Bulgaria, Croatia, Cyprus, Czechia, Denmark, Estonia, Finland, France, Germany, Greece, Hungary, Iceland, Ireland, Italy, Latvia, Lithuania, Luxembourg, Malta, Netherlands, Norway, Poland, Portugal, Romania, Slovakia, Slovenia, Spain, Sweden, Switzerland, and the United Kingdom.) was 89, the average score was 64 and the worst score was 40. For comparison with worldwide scores, the best score was 89 (ranked 1), the average score was 42, and the worst score was 9 (ranked 181, in a two-way tie).

The 2025 score, issued in February 2026, is an improvement over the Czech Republic's 2024 score of 56. However, Ondřej Kopečný, head of TI Czechia, the Czech branch of Transparency International, said in November 2025 that “The government of Prime Minister Petr Fiala cannot claim any significant success in fighting corruption. The passage of anti-corruption laws is frequently delayed or obstructed by members of the governing coalition.”

== Areas ==
=== Political corruption ===
A series of political corruption cases has damaged the image of Nečas’ administration (see corruption cases below), which is reflected in Transparency International's Global Corruption Barometer 2013, which reveals that 73% of the surveyed Czechs consider political parties to be “corrupt” or “extremely corrupt”.

=== Business corruption ===
According to Ernst & Young's 2012 Global Fraud Survey, 80% of surveyed companies perceive bribery and corruption to be widespread in the business sector, and fewer than 10% state that between 2009 and 2011 their companies “very frequently/always” conducted due diligence on fraud and corruption-related risks before or after acquiring a new business.

Although the business environment is characterised by a clear set of rules and little interference, corruption remains an obstacle to doing business in public procurement, awarding of subsidies and direct interactions between public and private sectors.

=== Corruption cases ===
Miloslav Ludvík, a former Motol University Hospital director who served as Minister of Health from 2016 to 2017, is now among 16 individuals charged with bribery and fraud linked to construction contracts valued at over CZK 4 billion, underscoring a serious crackdown on corruption in the country’s healthcare system.

In Brno, several South Moravian officials have set up a well-functioning business to earn extra money on top of their salaries. Instead of punishing, officials helped road pirates in 2022.

In an alleged EU-subsidies fraud, Czech Prime Minister Andrej Babiš was accused of illegally obtaining €2 million in EU subsidies designated for small businesses by concealing his ownership of a farm and a convention center called "Storks Nest" (Czech: Čapí hnízdo). Czech police requested that the Lower House lift his parliamentary immunity on two occasions, in September and November 2017. In both cases, the Lower House lifted the immunity and the police have initiated criminal proceedings. He is accused of the crime of alleged fraud (§212, Criminal Code, 2009) and of wilful damage to the financial interests of the European Union (§ 260, Criminal Code, 2009) in the criminal conspiracy (§ 89, Art. 17, Crime Code (the Czechoslovak Criminal Code, 1961).

Operation Dozimetr was a police operation in June 2022 related to the investigation of corruption at Prague City Hall linked primarily to Transport Enterprise of the Capital City of Prague (DPP). After more than two years of monitoring, the Police of the Czech Republic carried out a mass raid on the Prague City Hall, at the headquarters of the Transport Enterprises of the Capital City of Prague and at dozens of other places. Eleven of the thirteen defendants were arrested, including the then Deputy Mayor of Prague, Petr Hlubuček, a member of Mayors and Independents, or the influential Zlín businessman, Michal Redl, who is the alleged head of the group. The Group was accused, for example, of influencing the public contracts of the Transport Company of the Capital City of Prague (DPP), bribery and efforts to divest assets from DPP and other institutions.

A case in 2009 involved Defence Minister Vlasta Parkanová overpaying for four aeroplanes in a 3.5 billion crown military contract. As a Member of Parliament, Parkanová was immune from criminal prosecution, however. Finance Minister Miroslav Kalousek was also implicated in the case.

In June 2012, a former director of the entity in charge of allocating EU funds in the Liberec, Usti, and Labem regions was sentenced to 7.5 years imprisonment and a US$40,000 fine after being convicted of bribery in connection with the granting of EU funds.

The 2013 Czech political corruption scandal involved an anti-corruption raid, launched by the organised crime unit. It resulted in the arrest of the prime minister's chief of staff, Jana Nagyová, and seven others. The unit also confiscated approximately GBR 5 million in cash and 10 kg of gold found in government offices, banks and private properties. The crimes are suspected to include bribery and abuse of power.

There are many corruption cases related to the railway company České dráhy.

=== Enhancing Civil Society Participation ===
Citizens' participation and the values of integrity, accountability, and transparency are crucial components of fighting corruption. It is important to develop programs and actions to change the cultural understanding of corruption and help citizens to act against abuses.

=== Police corruption ===
Police corruption in the Czech Republic can be perceived in two categories: petty everyday corruption (e.g., bribery and favouritism), and major economic corruption, involving foreign investments requiring both state support and subsidy decision-making.

Within these areas, sections 158 – 162 detail forms of corruption ranging from abuse of power by a public official to indirect bribery. The Czech Republic joined the EU in May 2004, following the splitting of Czechoslovakia in 1993. Since this split, corruption has made a steady incline. In 2001, 163 individuals were prosecuted with corrupt activity, of whom 142 were in relation to bribery. This is in comparison to the 110 individuals prosecuted in 2000. In 1995, the number of ascertained crimes committed by officers with involvement in management and administration was calculated at 1,081; by 1999, this figure had jumped 10.1% to 5,081, which steadily declined into the 2000s. Royalties gained through major economic corruption are largely conspicuous. Tied up in ostentatious villas, over-budget public construction projects and local government offices. These "landmarks" are prominent enough to prompt guided tours around Prague. Curious tourists are directed between structures funded through large sums of taxpayers' money. Money ends up in the pockets of civil servants and corrupt businessmen.

In 1991, the "Service for the Protection of Economic Interests" was set up, which later evolved into the "Unit for Combating Corruption and Serious Economic Crime of the Criminal Police and Investigation Service" in January 2002. Its function: to detect connections between corruption and organised crime, in cooperation with the "Criminal Police Service and Investigation Unit of the Czech Police for Revealing Organised Crime". Similarly, the "Inspection Department of the Ministry of the Interior" (IDMI) a police unit that deals with offences committed by police officers. This unit targets petty everyday corruption, involving low-level employees of the state who abuse their power for personal gain. Policemen earn a fraction of the salary of a military officer. Where the Fire Brigade has 14 districts within the Czech Republic, the Police force only has 8, resulting in limited opportunity for climbing regional ranks. Policemen must also undergo far lengthier training than their better-paid Army and Fire Brigade colleagues. Such inequities prompt feelings of resentment among Police ranks. As a result, systems are now in place to combat petty corruption. Including automated cameras at traffic lights, sending infringements directly to a driver, avoiding any physical interaction with a policing officer. At the same time, "The Unit for Combating Corruption and Financial Crime" (UOKFK), established by the Ministry of the Interior, also provides continuing education relating to domestic corruption and integrity of the Czech police force. Police Corruption in the Czech Republic is an ongoing issue, however, one that is actively combatted through state and local action.

== See also ==
- Crime in the Czech Republic
- International Anti-Corruption Academy
- Group of States Against Corruption
- International Anti-Corruption Day
- ISO 37001 Anti-bribery management systems
- United Nations Convention against Corruption
- OECD Anti-Bribery Convention
- Transparency International
