= Muller's method =

Algorithm for finding roots of a function

Muller's method is a root-finding algorithm, a numerical method for solving equations of the form f(x) = 0. It was first presented by David E. Muller in 1956.

Animation illustrating Muller's method applied to the function f(x) = cos(x) − x. At each iteration, a parabola interpolating three points is constructed, and one of its roots is used to generate the next approximation.

Muller's method proceeds according to a third-order recurrence relation similar to the second-order recurrence relation of the secant method. Whereas the secant method proceeds by constructing a line through two points on the graph of f corresponding to the last two iterative approximations and then uses the line's root as the next approximation at every iteration, by contrast, Muller's method uses three points corresponding to the last three iterative approximations, constructs a parabola through these three points, and then uses a root of the parabola as the next approximation at every iteration.

It converges with order $p \approx 1.839$, faster than the secant method but slower than Newton's method.

== Derivation ==
Muller's method uses three initial approximations of the root, $x_{0}, x_{1}$ and $x_{2}$, and determines the next approximation $x_{3}$ by considering the intersection of the x-axis with the parabola through $(x_{0}, f(x_{0}))$, $(x_{1}, f(x_{1}))$ and $(x_{2}, f(x_{2}))$.

Consider the quadratic polynomial
$$P(x) = a(x - x_{2})^2 + b(x - x_{2}) + c,$$

that passes through $(x_{0}, f(x_{0}))$, $(x_{1}, f(x_{1}))$ and $(x_{2}, f(x_{2}))$. To simplify notation, define the differences

$$h_{0} = x_{1} - x_{0}, \quad h_{1} = x_{2} - x_{1}$$

and
$$\delta_{0} = \frac{f(x_{1}) - f(x_{0})}{h_{0}}, \quad
\delta_{1} = \frac{f(x_{2}) - f(x_{1})}{h_{1}}.$$

Substituting each of the three points $(x_{0}, f(x_{0}))$, $(x_{1}, f(x_{1}))$ and $(x_{2}, f(x_{2}))$ into $P(x)$ and solving simultaneously for $a, b$ and $c$ gives

$$a = \frac{\delta_{1} - \delta_{0}}{h_{1} + h_{0}}, \quad b = ah_{1} + \delta_{1}, \quad c = f(x_{2}).$$

The quadratic formula is then applied to $P(x)$ to determine $x_{3}$ as

$$x_{3} - x_{2} = \frac{-2c}{b + \operatorname{sign}(b) \sqrt{b^2 - 4ac}} = \frac{-2c}{b (1 + \sqrt{1 - 4ac/b^2})},$$
where the sign preceding the radical term is chosen to match the sign of $b$ to ensure the next iterate is closest to $x_{2}$. Thus,

$$x_{3} = x_{2} - \frac{2c}{b(1 + \sqrt{1 - 4ac/b^2})}.$$

Once $x_{3}$ is determined, the process is repeated. Note that due to the radical expression in the denominator, iterates can be complex even when the previous iterates are all real. This is in contrast with other root-finding algorithms like the secant method, Sidi's generalized secant method or Newton's method, whose iterates will remain real if one starts with real numbers. Having complex iterates can be an advantage (if one is looking for complex roots) or a disadvantage (if it is known that all roots are real), depending on the problem.

The method can easily be adopted for scenarios, such as collision detection, where not the closest root is of interest, but the smaller one by replacing $\operatorname{sign}(b)$ with $\operatorname{sign}(-a)$:
$$x_{3} = x_{2} - \frac{2c}{b - \operatorname{sign}(a)\sqrt{b^2 - 4ac}}.$$

== Algorithm ==
The following pseudocode describes Muller's method for approximating a root of the equation f(x) = 0. It returns an estimate $x_{3}$ that satisfies $|x_{3} - x_{2}| < \varepsilon$, where $\varepsilon$ is a user-specified tolerance.

input: function f, initial approximations x0, x1, x2, tolerance ε, maximum iterations Nmax
for n = 0 to Nmax do
   h0 ← x1 − x0
   h1 ← x2 − x1
   δ0 ← (f(x1) − f(x0)) / h0
   δ1 ← (f(x2) − f(x1)) / h1
   a ← (δ1 − δ0) / (h1 + h0)
   b ← a·h1 + δ1
   c ← f(x2)
   if b ≥ 0 then
       denominator ← b + sqrt(b² − 4·a·c)
   else
       denominator ← b − sqrt(b² − 4·a·c)
   end if
   x3 ← x2 − 2·c / denominator
   if |x3 − x2| < ε then
       return x3
   end if
   x0 ← x1
   x1 ← x2
   x2 ← x3
end for
return x3

== Example ==
Suppose we seek a solution of the polynomial
$$f(x) = -x^3 - x + 7 \,.$$

Applying Muller's method with initial guesses $x_{0}=1$, $x_{1}=2$ and $x_{2}=3$ and a tolerance of $10^{-9}$ gives the following approximations:

Iteration	$a$	$b$	$c$	Denominator	$x_n$	$f(x_n)$
$3$	$-6.0$	$-26.0$	$-23$	$-37.13552$	$1.7612940604716703$	$-2.2510 \times 10^{-1}$
$4$	$-6.76129$	$-10.01078$	$-0.22510$	$-19.71273$	$1.7384555878656442$	$7.53555 \times 10^{-3}$
$5$	$-6.49974$	$-10.03787$	$7.53555 \times 10^{-3}$	$-20.08549$	$1.7392059353750402$	$-2.08961 \times 10^{-5}$
$6$	$-5.23895$	$-10.07452$	$-2.08961 \times 10^{-5}$	$-20.14903$	$1.7392038612200968$	$-3.42854 \times 10^{-11}$

To the required tolerance, Muller's method generates the solution $1.7392038612200968$ on the sixth iteration.

By modifying the initial guesses, Muller's method can also generate complex solutions. Applying Muller's method again but with initial guesses $x_{0}=-1$, $x_{1}=-2$ and $x_{2}=-3$ and a tolerance of $10^{-9}$ gives the following approximations:

Iteration	Denominator	$x_n$	$f(x_n)$
$3$	$-26-14.56021i$	$-0.8333333333333335-1.2133516482134197i$	$4.73148 + 1.95484i$
$4$	$6.38915 - 24.72107i$	$-0.777821059050328-1.6104880890500035i$	$2.19616 + 0.356473i$
$5$	$9.46045 - 19.15717i$	$-0.8389286926696546-1.8095901140685215i$	$-.187858 - 0.295347i$
$6$	$13.02224 - 18.42210i$	$-0.8699227902463772-1.8080759128505213i$	$-3.44378 \times 10^{-3} + 2.09461 \times 10^{-3}i$
$7$	$13.08065-18.85860i$	$-0.8696017710815587-1.8079333552255168i$	$-1.67055 \times 10^{-7}-2.34332 \times 10^{-6}i$
$8$	$13.07447-18.86619i$	$-0.8696019306084998-1.8079332269621338i$	$-2.10054 \times 10^{-12} + 6.79900 \times 10^{-13}i$

To the required tolerance, Muller's method generates the complex solution $-0.8696019306084998-1.8079332269621338i$ on the eighth iteration.

== Speed of convergence ==
Suppose the real-valued function $f(x)$ has a root at $x=\alpha$. Let
$$e_{n} = x_{n} - \alpha$$
denote the error at the $n$-th iteration of Muller's method. By definition, we have
$$e_{n+1} = K  e_{n}^{p}$$
where $p$ is the order of convergence and $K$ is an asymptotic constant. Therefore,
$$e_{n} = K  e_{n-1}^{p}$$
and
$$e_{n-1} = K  e_{n-2}^{p}$$
which gives
$$e_{n-1} \sim e_{n}^{1/p}$$
and
$$e_{n-2} \sim e_{n}^{1/p^2}.$$
Near the root $x=\alpha$, Taylor's theorem gives
$$f(x) = f'(\alpha)(x - \alpha) + \frac{f''(\alpha)}{2}(x - \alpha)^{2} + R(x)$$
where $R(x)$ is the remainder term, defined as
$$R(x) = \frac{f'''(\xi)}{6}(x - \alpha)^{3}$$
for some $\xi$ between $x$ and $\alpha$. Using the three consecutive iterates of Mullers method, $x=x_{n}$, $x=x_{n-1}$ and $x=x_{n-2}$ evaluated at the root gives

$$R(\alpha) = O(e_{n}e_{n-1}e_{n-2})$$
or
$$e_{n+1} = O(e_{n}e_{n-1}e_{n-2})$$
since the next iterate is obtained by setting the interpolating quadratic to zero. Asymptotically,
$$e_{n+1} = Ke_{n}e_{n-1}e_{n-2}.$$
Using
$$e_{n-1} \sim e_{n}^{1/p}$$
and
$$e_{n-2} \sim e_{n}^{1/p^2}$$
gives
$$e_{n+1} = K e_{n}^{1 + \frac{1}{p} + \frac{1}{p^2}}.$$

By definition,
$$e_{n+1} = K e_{n}^{p}$$
so equating exponents gives
$$p = 1 + \frac{1}{p} + \frac{1}{p^2}$$
which can be rearranged to give

$$p^{3} - p^{2} - p - 1 = 0.$$

Solving this equation gives $p \approx 1.839$, so the order of convergence of Muller's method is exactly the tribonacci constant. This can be compared with approximately 1.618, exactly the golden ratio, for the secant method and with exactly 2 for Newton's method. So, the secant method makes less progress per iteration than Muller's method and Newton's method makes more progress.

More precisely, if $\alpha$ denotes a single root of $f(x)$ and $f'(\alpha) \neq 0$ and $f(x)$ is three times continuously differentiable, if the initial guesses $x_{0}$, $x_{1}$ and $x_{2}$ are taken sufficiently close to $\alpha$, then the iterates satisfy
$$\lim_{k\to\infty} \frac{|x_k-\alpha|}{|x_{k-1}-\alpha|^\mu} = \left| \frac{f'''(\alpha)}{6f'(\alpha)} \right|^{(\mu-1)/2}$$

where $\mu \approx 1.84$ is the positive solution of $x^3 - x^2 - x - 1 = 0$, the defining equation for the tribonacci constant.

== Generalizations and related methods ==
Muller's method fits a parabola, i.e. a second-order polynomial, to the last three obtained points f(x_{k−1}), f(x_{k−2}) and f(x_{k−3}) in each iteration. One can generalize this and fit a polynomial p_{k,m}(x) of degree m to the last m+1 points in the k-th iteration. Our parabola y_{k} is written as p_{k,2} in this notation. The degree m must be 1 or larger. The next approximation x_{k} is now one of the roots of the p_{k,m}, i.e. one of the solutions of p_{k,m}(x) = 0. Taking m = 1 we obtain the secant method whereas m = 2 gives Muller's method.

Muller calculated that the sequence {x_{k}} generated this way converges to the root ξ with an order μ_{m} where μ_{m} is the positive solution of $x^{m+1} - x^m - x^{m-1} - \dots - x - 1 = 0$.

As m approaches infinity the positive solution for the equation approaches 2. The method is much more difficult though for m > 2 than it is for m = 1 or m = 2 because it is much harder to determine the roots of a polynomial of degree 3 or higher. Another problem is that there seems no prescription of which of the roots of p_{k,m} to pick as the next approximation x_{k} for m > 2.

These difficulties are overcome by Sidi's generalized secant method which also employs the polynomial p_{k,m}. Instead of trying to solve p_{k,m}(x) = 0, the next approximation x_{k} is calculated with the aid of the derivative of p_{k,m} at x_{k−1} in this method.

== See also ==
- Halley's method, with cubic convergence
- Householder's method, includes Newton's, Halley's and higher-order convergence
