= König (disambiguation) =

König is a German surname.

König may also refer to:

== Businesses ==
- Koenig (organ builder), a French pipe organ builder
- Koenig & Bauer, a German company that makes printing presses
- König Brewery, a brewery in Duisburg, Germany and its beer König Pilsener
- König Ludwig Schlossbrauerei, a brewery in Fürstenfeldbruck, Germany
- Koenig Specials, a German luxury car tuning house

== Places ==
- König (crater), a lunar crater named after Rudolf König
- Koenig, Missouri, a community in the United States
- Konig, South Carolina, a populated place
- König Glacier, South Georgia
- König Pilsener Arena, a sports centre in Oberhausen, Germany
- König Palast, sports venue in Krefeld, Germany
- Koenig Valley, Antarctica
- 3815 König, an asteroid
- Bad König, a spa town in Hesse, Germany
- Museum Koenig, a history museum in Bonn, Germany, named after Alexander Koenig

== Science ==
- Kőnig's lemma, in graph theory
- König's syndrome, a syndrome of abdominal pain in relation to meals
- König's theorem (disambiguation)

== Transportation ==
- Formula König, a formula racing series active from 1988 to 2004
- König SC 430, König SD 570, aircraft engines designed by Dieter König
- König-class battleship, a German battleship class at the time of World War I
  - SMS König, the lead ship of that class
- SMS König Albert, a German battleship at the time of World War I
- SMS König Wilhelm, a frigate of the Prussian navy
- SS König Albert, a German ocean liner at the time of World War I

== Other uses ==
- Koenig Memorandum, an Israeli government document of 1976
- "König", a song by Nico from the 1985 album Camera Obscura

== See also ==
- Kenig
- King (surname)
- Königsberg (disambiguation)
