= Kenig =

Kenig is a surname of Ashkenazi Jewish (Yiddish) origin, represents a variation of König. Notable people with the surname include:

- Alejandro Kenig (born 1969), Argentine footballer
- Ariel Kenig (born 1983), French writer
- Carlos Kenig (born 1953), Argentine mathematician
- Jan Ignacy Kenig (1822–1880), Polish engineer
- Maya Kenig, Israeli film director

Kenig or Kyonig is also the colloquial Russian name for Kaliningrad (formerly the German city of Königsberg, from which the nickname is derived)
