= Königsberg (disambiguation) =

Königsberg was the capital of East Prussia, renamed Kaliningrad in 1946.

Königsberg may also refer to:

== Places ==
- Königsberg (region), a government region of the Prussian province of East Prussia 1815–1945
- Königsberg, Bavaria, a town in Lower Franconia, Bavaria, Germany
- Königsberg an der Eger, German name for Kynšperk nad Ohří in the Czech Republic
- Königsberg in der Neumark, German name for Chojna, Poland
- Königsberg, German name for Kongsberg in Norway
- Königsberg in der Priegnitz, a component of Heiligengrabe in Landkreis Ostprignitz-Ruppin, Brandenburg
- Königsberg in Schlesien, German name for Klimkovice in the Czech Republic
- Königsberg, a former name of Kynau (Zagórze Śląskie) and Kynsburg (Grodno Castle)
- Königsberg, German name for Nová Baňa, Slovakia
- Königsberg, alternative name of Sarreinsberg, a component of Goetzenbruck, France
- Konigsberg, a former name of Silver Mountain, California
- Kunšperk, a settlement in the Municipality of Bistrica ob Sotli, Slovenia, known as Königsberg until 1918

== Mountains ==
- Königsberg (Brocken), a side peak of Brocken mountain
- Königsberg (Goslar), a mountain in Goslar
- Königsberg (North Palatine Uplands), near Wolfstein in Rhineland-Palatinate
- Königsberg (Osterhorn Group), in the Osterhorn Group, Austria
- Königsberg (Göstling Alps), in the Göstling Alps, part of the Ybbstal Alps, Lower Austria
- Königsberg (vineyard), a vineyard on the Moselle
- Kráľova hoľa in Slovakia (Königsberg in German)

== Ships ==
- Königsberg class cruiser (1905), four ships built between 1905 and 1907
  - SMS Königsberg (1905), lead ship of the class, stationed in German East Africa at the start of World War I
- Königsberg class cruiser (1915), four cruisers built during World War I to replace the original Königsberg class, all four ships having been sunk or decommissioned
  - SMS Königsberg (1915), lead ship of the class
- Königsberg class cruiser (1927), also known as the K class, a class of three light cruisers built between the two World Wars
  - German cruiser Königsberg, lead ship of this class
- SS Königsberg, a German cargo ship in service 1934–39

== People with the surname ==
- Woody Allen (Heywood "Woody" Allen, born Allan Stewart Konigsberg in 1935), American film director, actor, writer, and comedian
- Bill Konigsberg (born 1970), American author
- E. L. Konigsburg (1930–2013), American author of From the Mixed-Up Files of Mrs. Basil E. Frankweiler
- Frank Konigsberg (1933–2016), American lawyer, television producer and agent
- Nancy Koenigsberg (born 1927), American artist of fine art textiles

== See also ==
- Seven Bridges of Königsberg, a topology problem
- Kings Mountain (disambiguation)
- Kongsberg, a town in Norway
- Königsburg, a ruined medieval castle in the German state of Saxony-Anhalt
- Château du Haut-Kœnigsbourg (German: Hohkönigsburg), a castle in Orschwiller, Alsace, France
