= Kőnig's theorem (complex analysis) =

In complex analysis and numerical analysis, Kőnig's theorem, named after the Hungarian mathematician Gyula Kőnig, gives a way to estimate simple poles or simple roots of a function. In particular, it has numerous applications in root finding algorithms like Newton's method and its generalization Householder's method.

== Statement ==
Given a meromorphic function defined on $|x|<R$:

$$f(x) = \sum_{n=0}^\infty c_nx^n, \qquad c_0\neq 0.$$

which only has one simple pole $x=r$ in this disk. Then

$$\frac{c_n}{c_{n+1}} = r + o(\sigma^{n+1}),$$

where $0<\sigma<1$ such that $|r|<\sigma R$. In particular, we have

$$\lim_{n\rightarrow \infty} \frac{c_n}{c_{n+1}} = r.$$

== Intuition ==
Recall that

$$\frac{C}{x-r}=-\frac{C}{r}\,\frac{1}{1-x/r}=-\frac{C}{r}\sum_{n=0}^{\infty}\left[\frac{x}{r}\right]^n,$$

which has coefficient ratio equal to $\frac{1/r^n}{1/r^{n+1}}=r.$

Around its simple pole, a function $f(x) = \sum_{n=0}^\infty c_nx^n$ will vary akin to the geometric series and this will also be manifest in the coefficients of $f$.

In other words, near x=r we expect the function to be dominated by the pole, i.e.

$$f(x)\approx\frac{C}{x-r},$$

so that $\frac{c_n}{c_{n+1}}\approx r$.
