= König's theorem =

There are several theorems associated with the name König or Kőnig:

- Kőnig's theorem (set theory), named after the Hungarian mathematician Gyula Kőnig.
- Kőnig's theorem (complex analysis), named after the Hungarian mathematician Gyula Kőnig.
- Kőnig's theorem (graph theory), named after his son Dénes Kőnig.
- König's theorem (kinetics), named after the German mathematician Samuel König.

== See also ==
- Kőnig's lemma (also known as Kőnig's infinity lemma), named after Dénes Kőnig
