= Otto Hildebrand =

German pathologist and surgeon

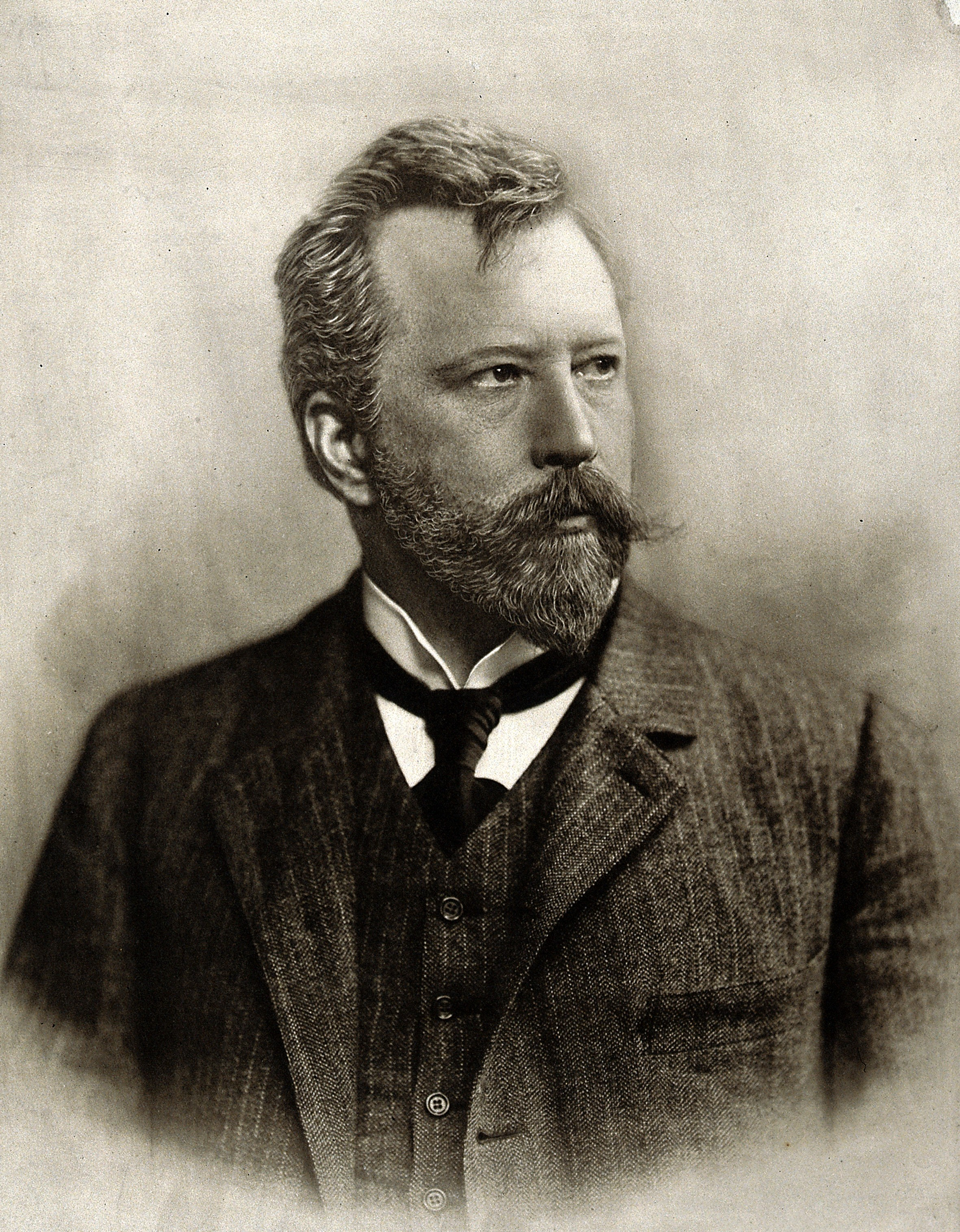
Portrait. Credit: Wellcome Library

Otto Hildebrand (15 November 1858, in Bern – 18 October 1927, in Berlin) was a German pathologist and surgeon. He was the son of economist Bruno Hildebrand (1812–1878) and the brother of sculptor Adolf von Hildebrand (1847–1921).

== Biography ==
He studied anatomy and surgery at the University of Jena, and from 1886 served as assistant to Franz König at the University of Göttingen. In 1888 he obtained his habilitation for surgery, and in 1896 was named head of the surgical polyclinic at the Berlin-Charité. In 1899 he succeeded August Socin as a professor of surgery at the University of Basel, then in 1904 returned to Berlin as successor to his former mentor, Franz König, at the Charité.

His best written effort was on book on surgical and topographical anatomy, titled Grundriss der chirurgisch-topographischen Anatomie (1894). He was editor of the periodical Jahresbericht über die Fortschritte auf dem Gebiete der Chirurgie and the author of several biographies in the Allgemeine Deutsche Biographie. In 1895 he was the first to describe what would later be known as Warthin's tumor.
