= Franz König (surgeon) =

German surgeon (1832–1910)

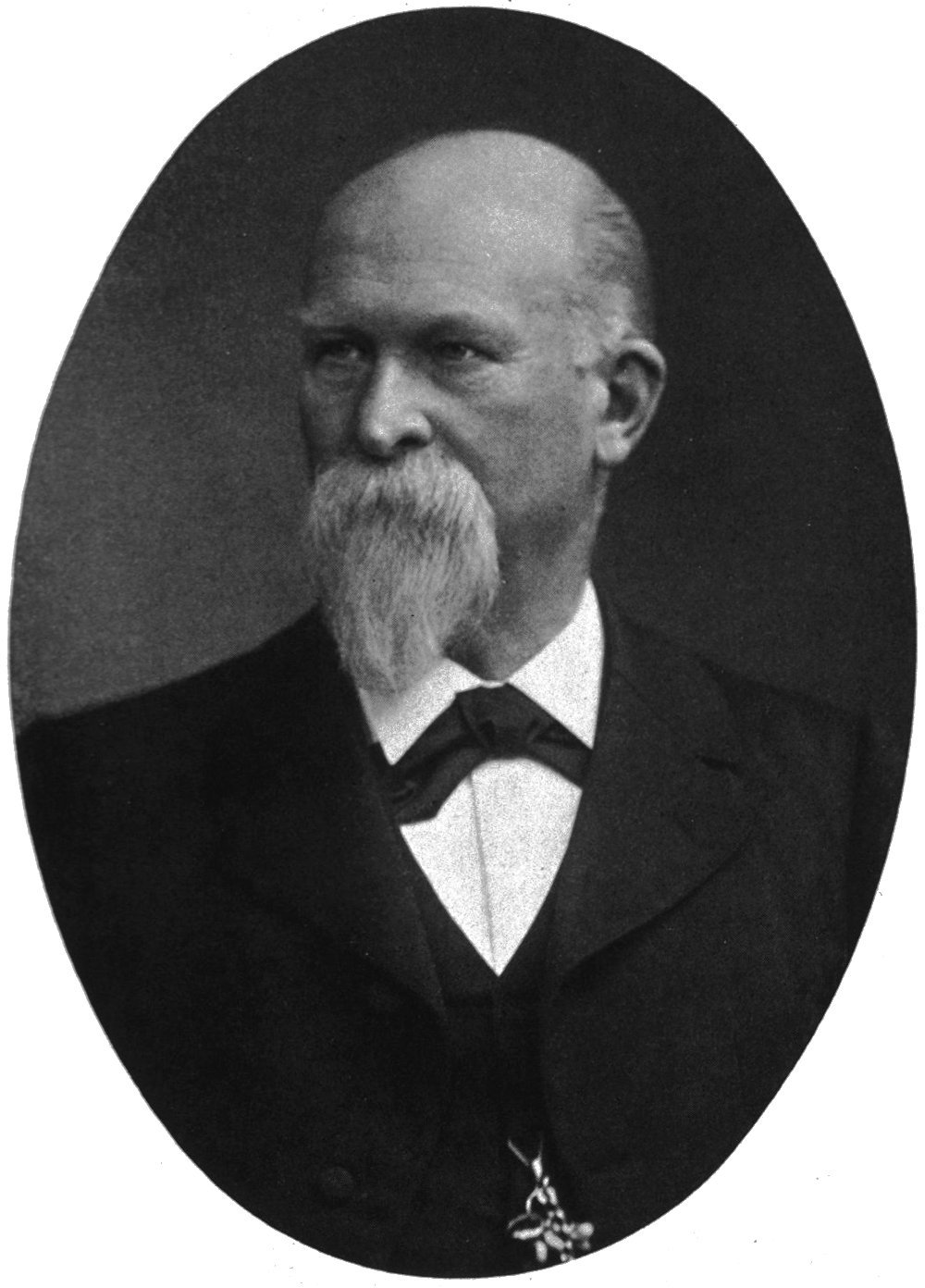

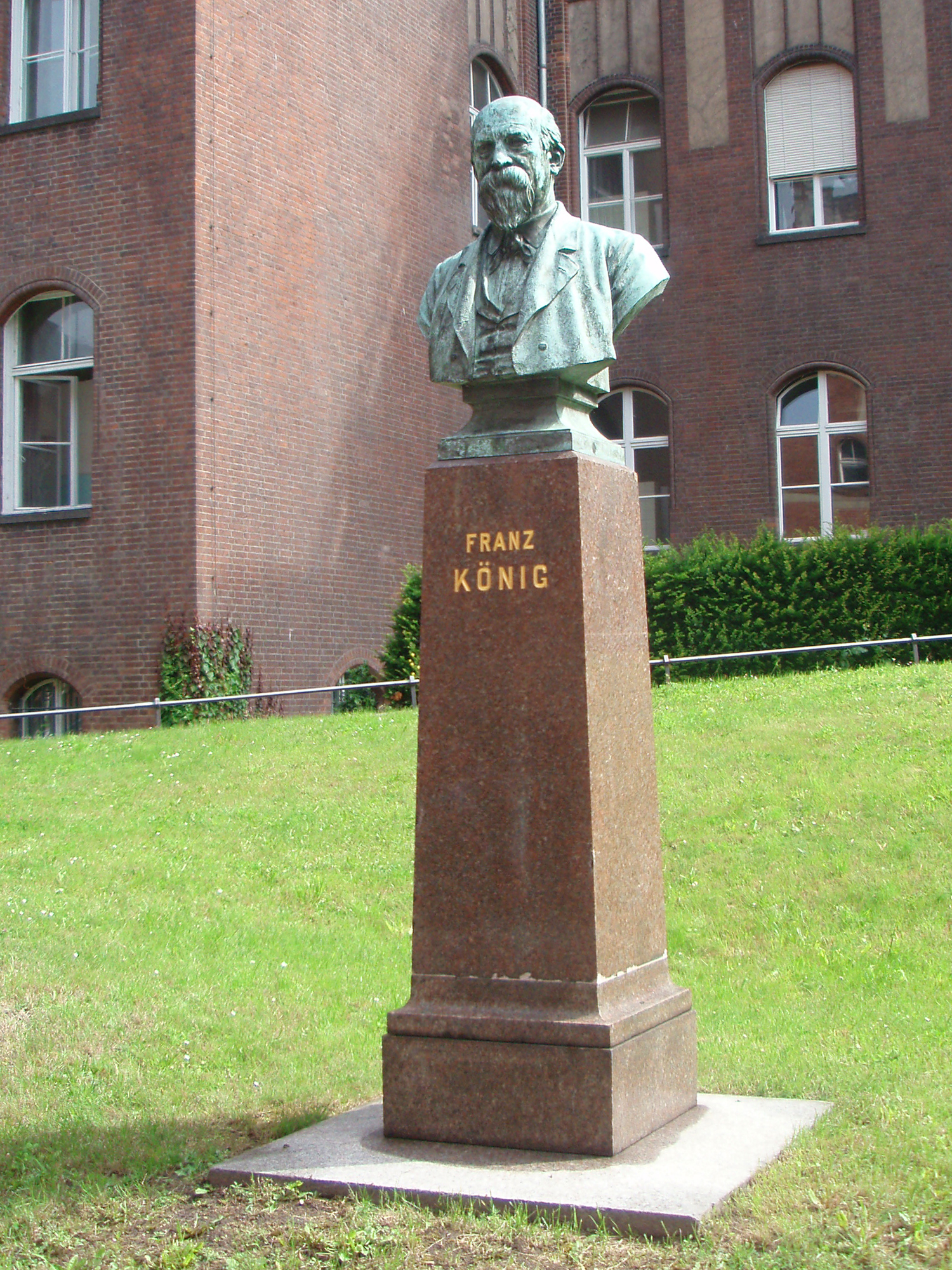
Monument to Franz König in Charité University Hospital in Berlin

Franz König (10 February 1832 – 12 December 1910) was a German surgeon. The son of a physician, he was born in Rotenburg an der Fulda.

In 1855 he received his doctorate from the University of Marburg, and was later district wound surgeon (Amtswundarzt) in Hanau. Afterwards he was a professor of surgery at the universities of Rostock (from 1869) and Göttingen (from 1875), and eventually at the Charité-Berlin, where in 1895 he succeeded Heinrich Adolf von Bardeleben. In 1904 he was succeeded at the Charité by Otto Hildebrand.

He died in Grunewald near Berlin.

König is largely remembered for his work in bone and joint surgery. He was the first surgeon to perform a successful internal fixation of proximal femur fractures. In 1887, he published a paper on the cause of loose bodies in the joint. In his paper, König concluded:

1. That trauma had to be very severe to break off parts of the joint surface.
2. That lesser degrees of trauma might contuse the bone to cause an area of necrosis which might then separate.
3. That in some cases, the absence of trauma made it likely that there existed some spontaneous cause of separation.

König named the disease "osteochondritis dissecans", describing it as a subchondral inflammatory process of the knee, resulting in a loose fragment of cartilage from the femoral condyle.

In 1892 he provided a comprehensive description of hemophilic arthropathy. He is credited for formulating three stages of hemophilic joint disease.

== Associated eponym ==
- König's syndrome: Various abdominal symptoms caused by an incomplete obstruction of the small intestine.
