= Zagórze Śląskie =

- Village
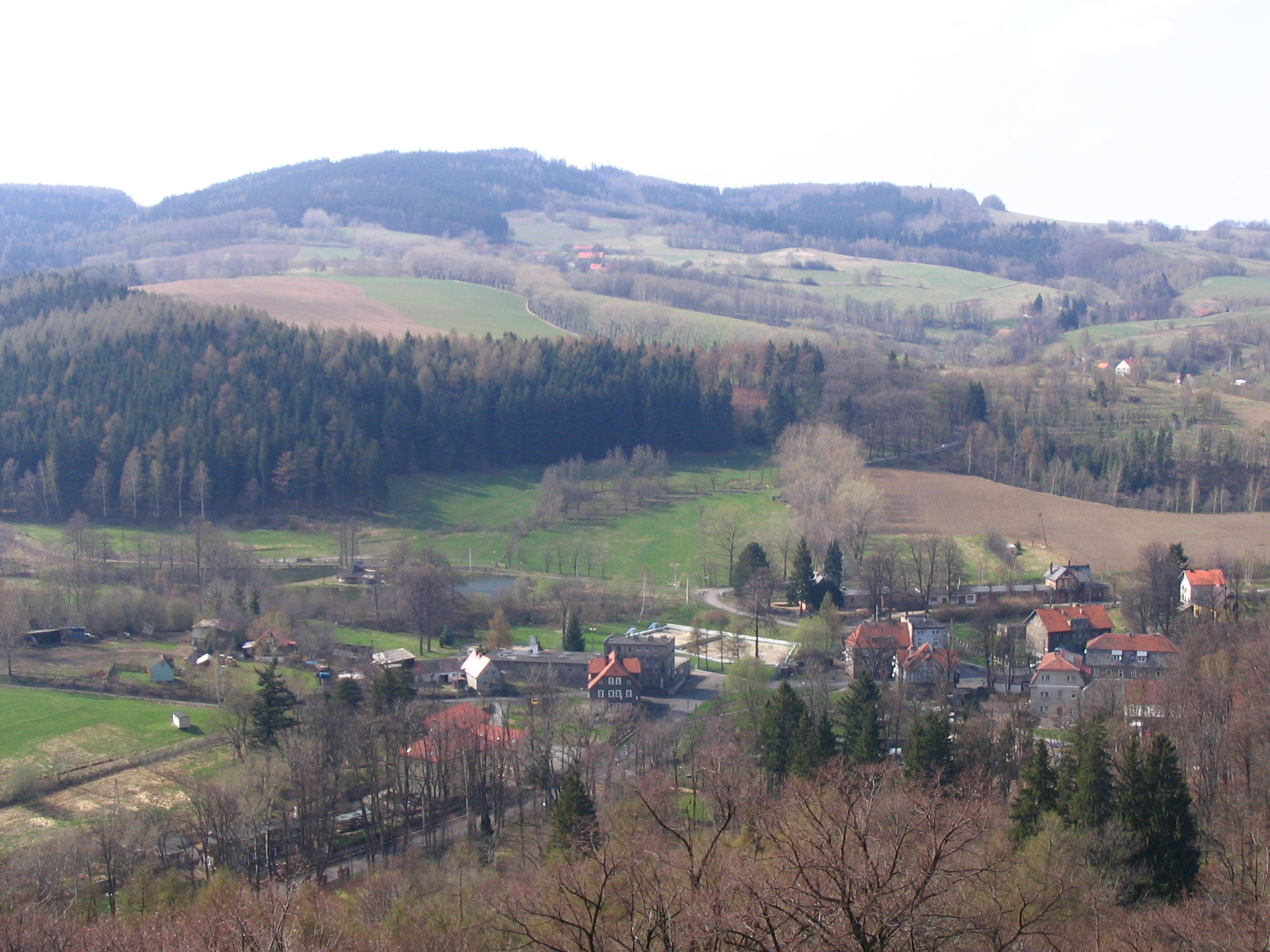
- Zagórze Śląskie from Grodno Castle

- Location within Poland
- Coordinates: 50°45′N 16°24′E
- Country: Poland
- Voivodeship: Lower Silesian
- County: Wałbrzych
- Gmina: Walim
- Time zone: UTC+1 (CET)
  - Summer (DST): UTC+2 (CEST)
- Vehicle registration: DBA

Zagórze Śląskie (Polish pronunciation: [zaˈɡuʐɛ ˈɕlɔ̃skʲɛ]) (Note: German: Kynau) is a village in the administrative district of Gmina Walim, within Wałbrzych County, Lower Silesian Voivodeship, in south-western Poland.

== History ==
Zagórze Śląskie arose at the foot of Grodno Castle built in the late 13th century by Duke Bolko I the Strict as a fortress near the border with the Kingdom of Bohemia. After it had fallen to the Bohemian crown in 1368 it was held as a fief by various possessors, among them the Counts of Hoberg at Książ until 1567 and Prince Michael the Brave of Wallachia.

== Sights ==
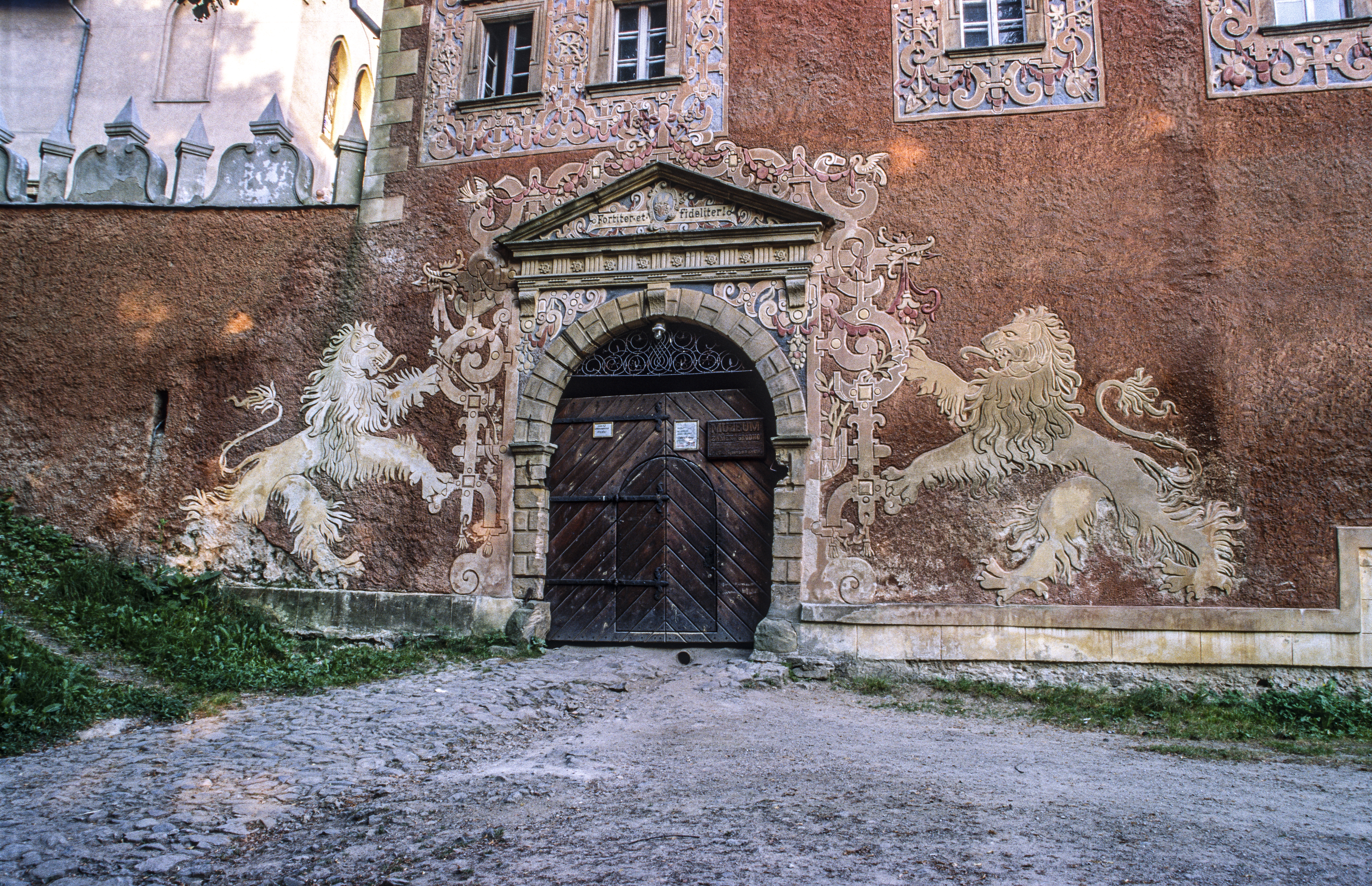
Entrance to Grodno Castle

- Grodno Castle
- Dam on Lubachowskie Lake
- Church, mentioned in 1376, existing from approx 1550

== Walking routes ==
- Green: "Szlak Zamków Piastowskich" to Grodziec Castle
- Yellow: PKP Wałbrzych Główny – Nowy Dwór Castle – Jedlina-Zdrój – Niedźwiedzica – Zagórze Śląskie – Zamek Grodno – Bystrzyca Górna – Świdnica – Ślęża – Wieżyca – PKP w Sobótce – Wrocław
- Blue: European walking route E3 Spain – Bulgaria
