= Nancy Koenigsberg =

American artist (b. 1927)

- Born: 1927 (age 97–98); Philadelphia, Pennsylvania, U.S.
- Education: The New School for Social Research, Skidmore College, Haystack Mountain School of Crafts
- Alma mater: Goucher College
- Awards: American Craft Council Fellow (2022)

Nancy Koenigsberg (born 1927), is an American sculptor and painter known for her knitted wire textiles and mixed media sculptures. In 2022, she was named a fellow of the American Craft Council. She lives in New York City.

== Biography ==
Nancy Koenigsberg was born in 1927 in Philadelphia, Pennsylvania. She has a B.A. degree (1949) from Goucher College. She also studied at the New School for Social Research, Skidmore College, and Haystack Mountain School of Crafts.

She was part of the 2016 to 2017 traveling group exhibition highlighting 36 contemporary fiber artists, “The Box Project: Uncommon Threads," curated by Mary Hunt Kahlenberg and collector Lloyd Cotsen.

Her work is in museum collections including at the Textile Museum in Washington, D.C.; the Cleveland Museum of Art; the Indianapolis Museum of Art; the Museum of Arts and Design in New York City; the Museum of Fine Arts, Houston; and the Racine Art Museum.
