= Jan Ignacy Kenig =

Polish engineer

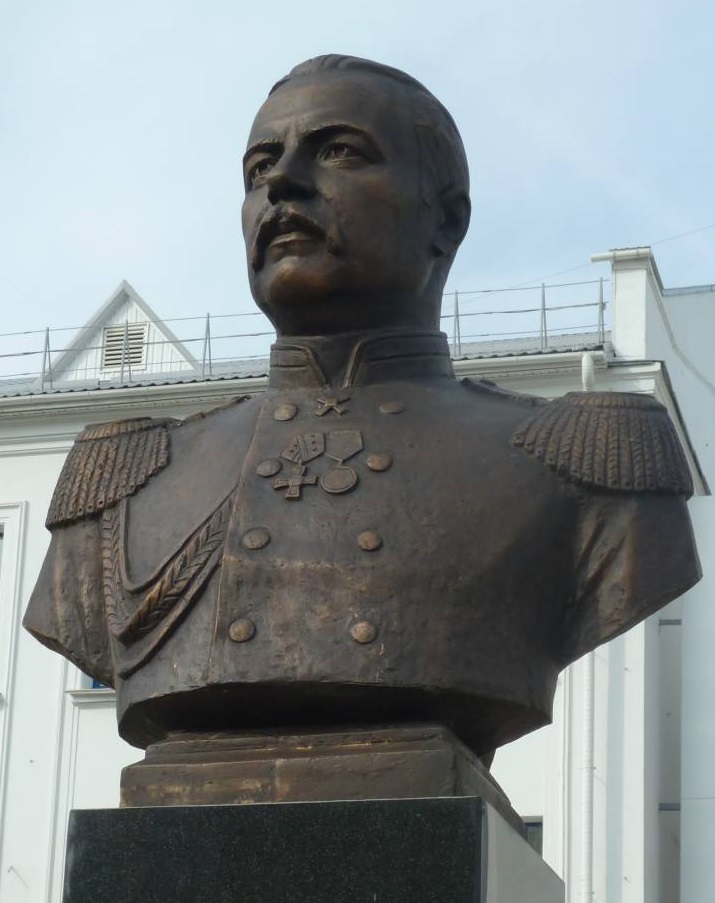
Kenig

Ivan Fyodorovich (Jan Ignacy) Kenig (1822–1880) was a Polish engineer in the Russian Empire. He was the engineer and director of the Mikołajewska Railway.
