= Ariel Kenig =

French writer (born 1983)

Ariel Kenig (born 24 June 1983) is a French writer. He was born to a French mother and a Polish father, grew up in a Parisian suburb, and discovered literature when he was 17.

== Biography ==
Kenig left school in 2003 to write. He met Audrey Diwan, a French writer and series editor at Denoël, which published his first novel, Camping Atlantic, in June 2005. The novel deals with teenage violence and boredom, and with the strength of brotherhood, through the story of the protagonist, Adonis.

Subsequently, Kenig dedicated himself to theater, writing three plays : Elle t'embrasse, Pas ce soir et Pompéi ou le suspense pornographique, before publishing his second novel, La Pause, in 2006, a work of social fiction that brings the reader to the suburbs of Paris and the industrial plants of carmaker Renault, and features Kenig's introspection and sociological observation. He then turned to other genres and published a pamphletary essay, Quitter la France, in which he analyses what remains of the French identity, a few weeks before Nicolas Sarkozy’s victory at the French presidential election. A fourth novel, New Wave, is due for release on August 27, 2008, by Flammarion, another prestigious French publishing house. It is based on a script by the French actor and screenwriter Gaël Morel.

== Novels and essays ==
- Camping Atlantic (January 2005, éditions Denoël–190 pages - ISBN 978-2-207-25609-1).
  - "In a purified style, Ariel Kenig offers a premium novel, which is at the same time sensitive, distressing and subtly orchestrated." (Glamour)
- La Pause (September 2006, éditions Denoël–145 pages–ISBN 978-2-207-25808-8).
  - "Ariel Kenig knows how to depict the fear of unemployment in the working class, the temptation of the nihilism among those abandoned by the society. He also says that the novels are never sad or merry. They either are written or aren't." (Le Monde)
- Quitter la France (March 2007, éditions Denoël–75 pages–ISBN 978-2-207-25960-3)
  - "Each sentence is a crumb of truth torn off with the nails." (Libération)

== Theater ==
- Pompéi ou le suspense pornographique
- Le Feu
- Pas ce soir

== Childhood ==
- Je ne suis pas un panda (to be published in late August 2008 - L'Ecole des loisirs)
- La littérature est un jeu (April 2007 - Librio Publ. - 92 pages - ISBN 978-2-290-00348-0)
- Mon oeil (August 2007 - Thierry Magnier Publ. - series: Photoroman - 115 pages - ISBN 978-2-84420-578-0)
