= Grodno Castle (Poland) =

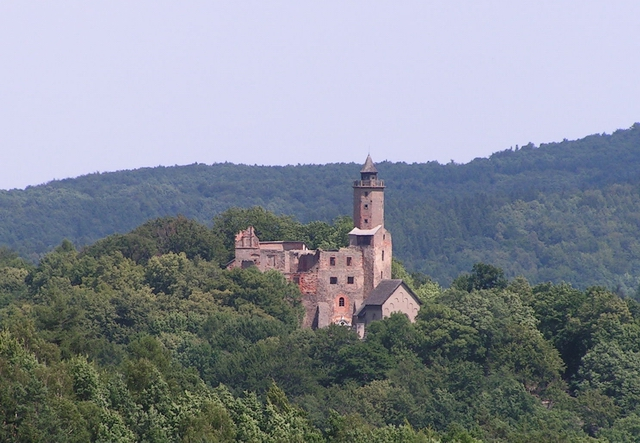
- Grodno Castle

- Location of the Grodno Castle in Poland Grodno Castle (Poland) (Lower Silesian Voivodeship)
- 50°45′01″N 16°24′39″E
- Location: Zagórze Śląskie, Lower Silesian Voivodeship, in Poland

History
- Built: 1193

Site notes
- Architectural styles: Gothic; Renaissance

Grodno Castle (German: Kynsburg) is a castle located in the southern parts of the Wałbrzych Mountains, on the Choina Mountain (450 metres), standing to the left of the river Bystrzyca. The valley of this river, formerly known as the Silesian Valley (Śląska Dolina, Polish), creates a natural boundary between the Owl Mountains and to the west of it the Wałbrzych Mountains. The castle is located in Zagórze Śląskie (11 km east of Wałbrzych), Lower Silesian Voivodeship in Poland.

The picturesque location of the castle is exacerbated by the barraged Lubachowskie Lake in the foothills of the mountain.

== History ==
According to tradition the castle was built in 1193, by Duke Bolesław I the Tall. The castle, together with a network of fortresses was used as a defense line between the Duchy of Jawor and the Kingdom of Bohemia. In the sixteenth century Grodno Castle was expanded by a gatehouse, on which there is precious sgraffito, and a sundial clock from 1716. The castle was devastated in battles against the Swedes during the Thirty Years' War, slowly falling into ruins. In the nineteenth century the tower had collapsed. The last owner of Grodno, was the Zedlitz family, which had continued renovation works and strengthened the castle. When the region fell to Poland in 1945, the castle was initially renamed as Zamek Chojny, only later called Zamek Grodno.

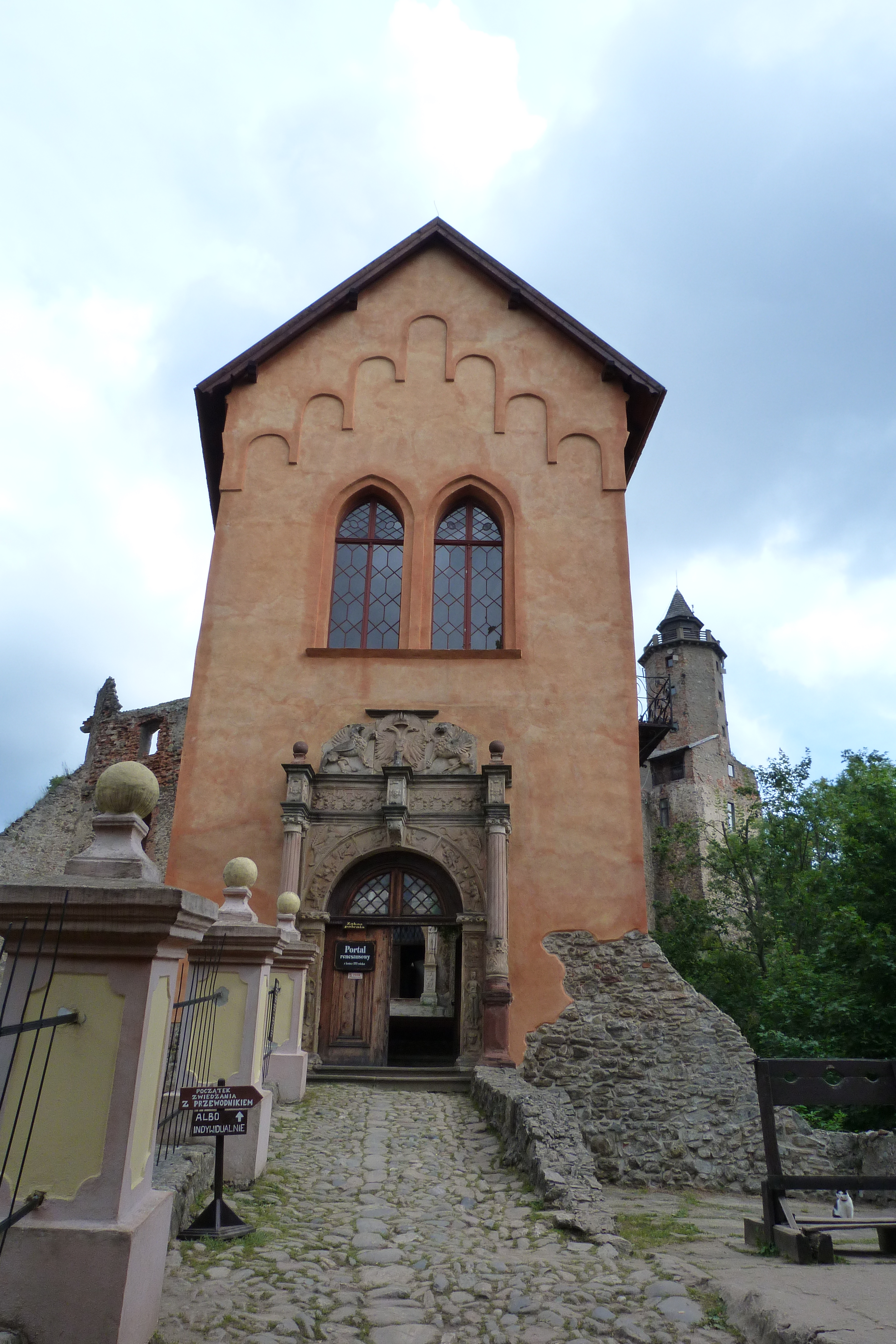
Gate tower

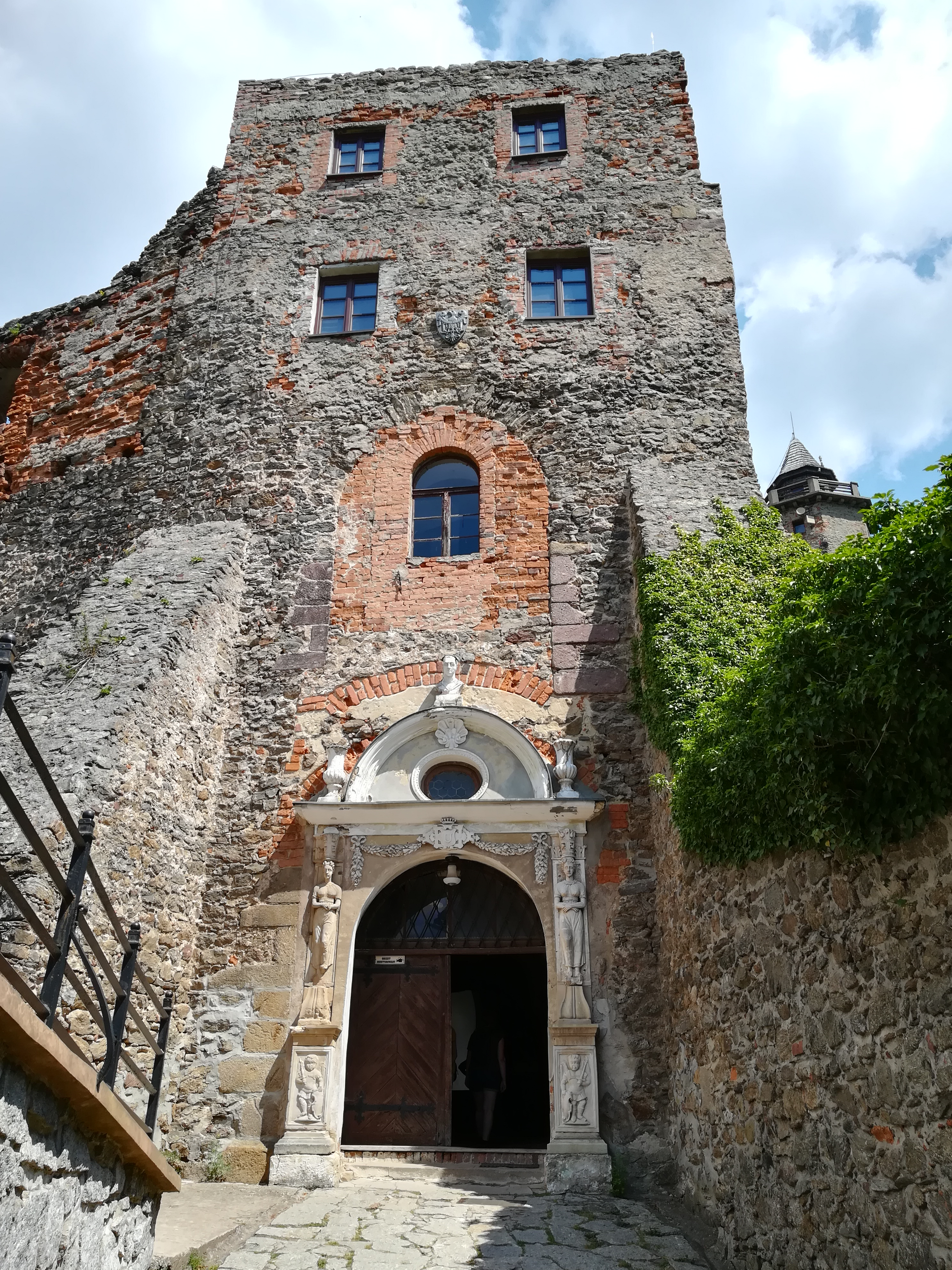
Main gate

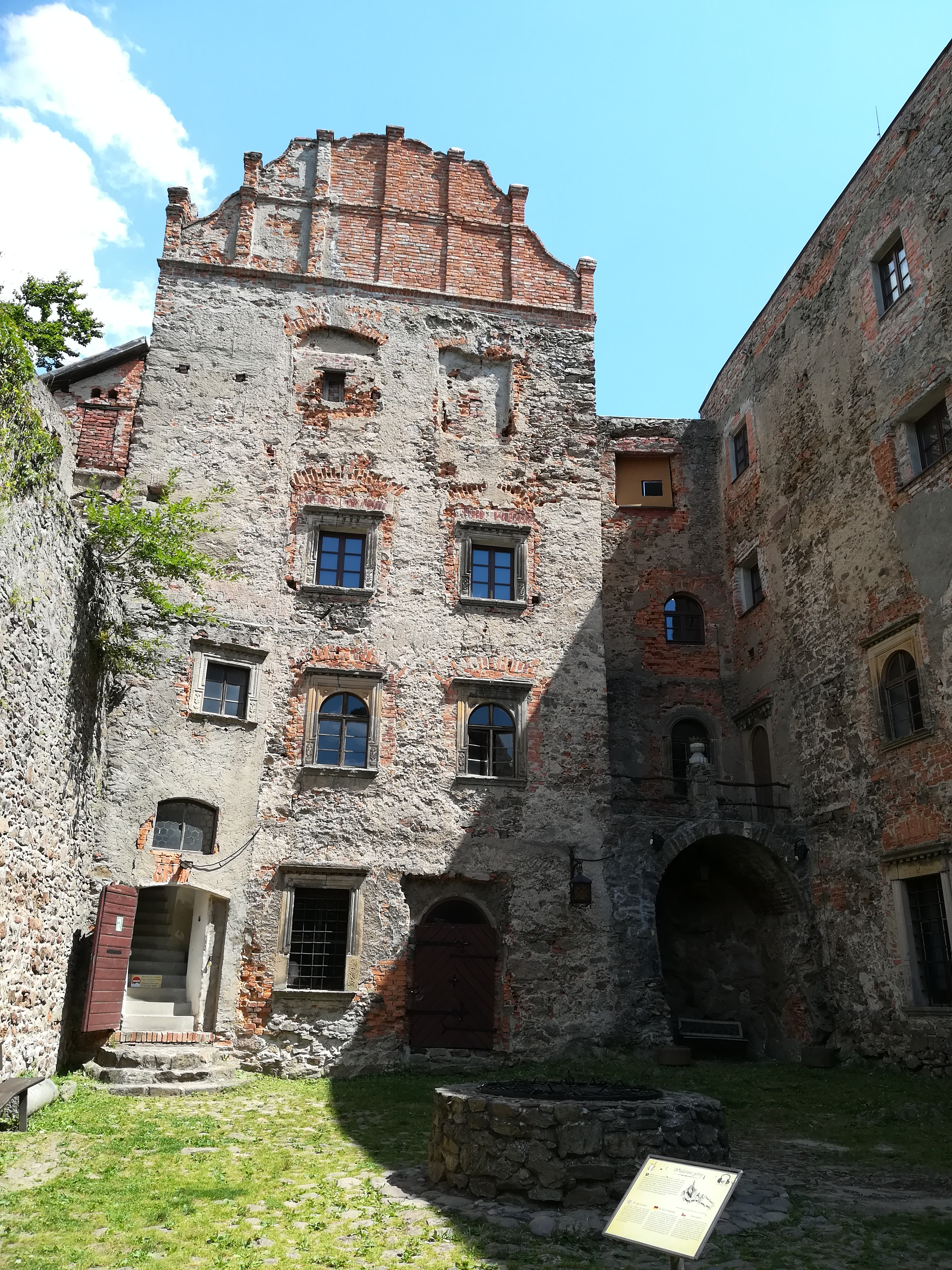
Courtyard

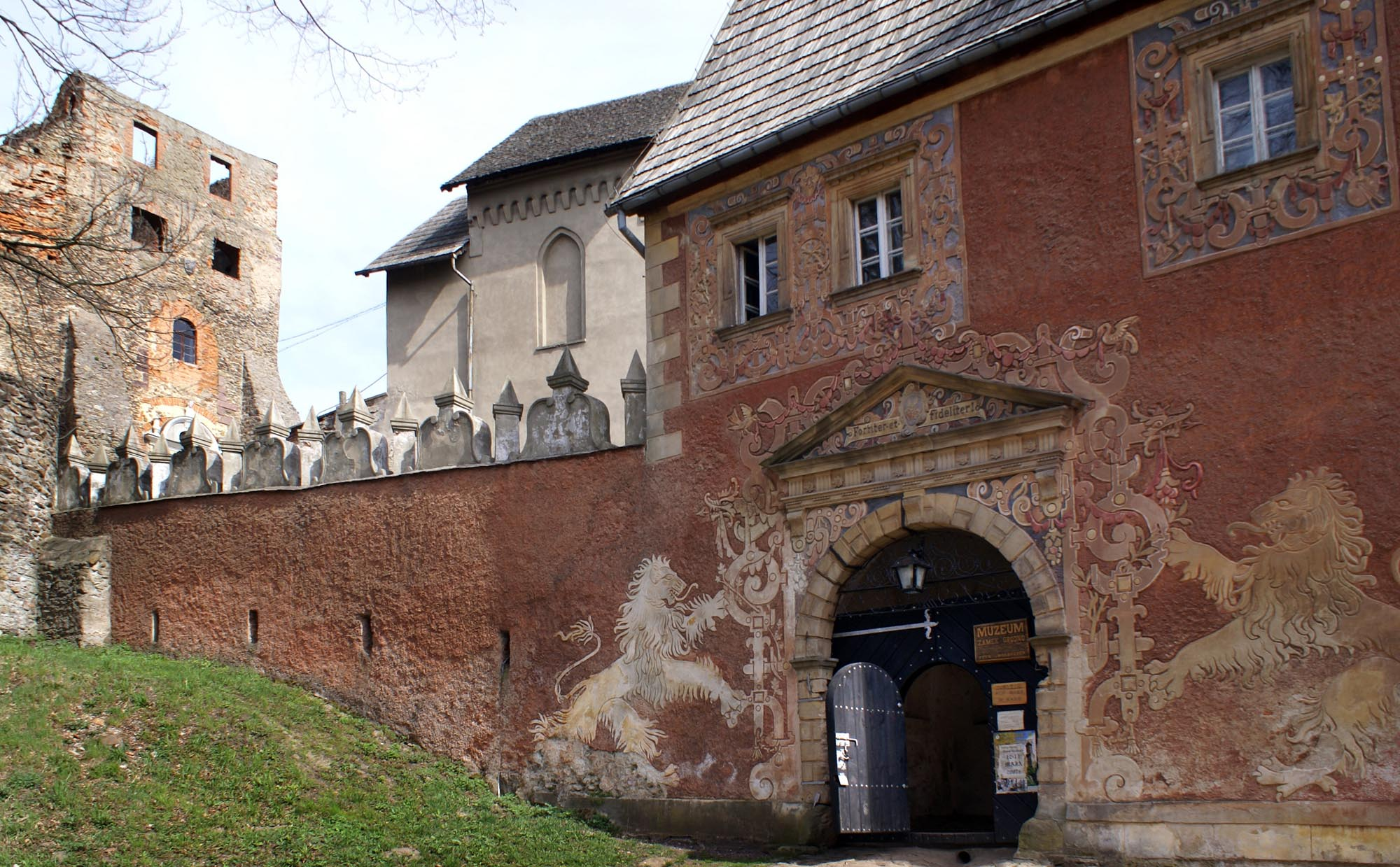
Entrance to a gatehouse

== See also ==
- Castles in Poland
