= König's syndrome =

- Specialty: Gastroenterology

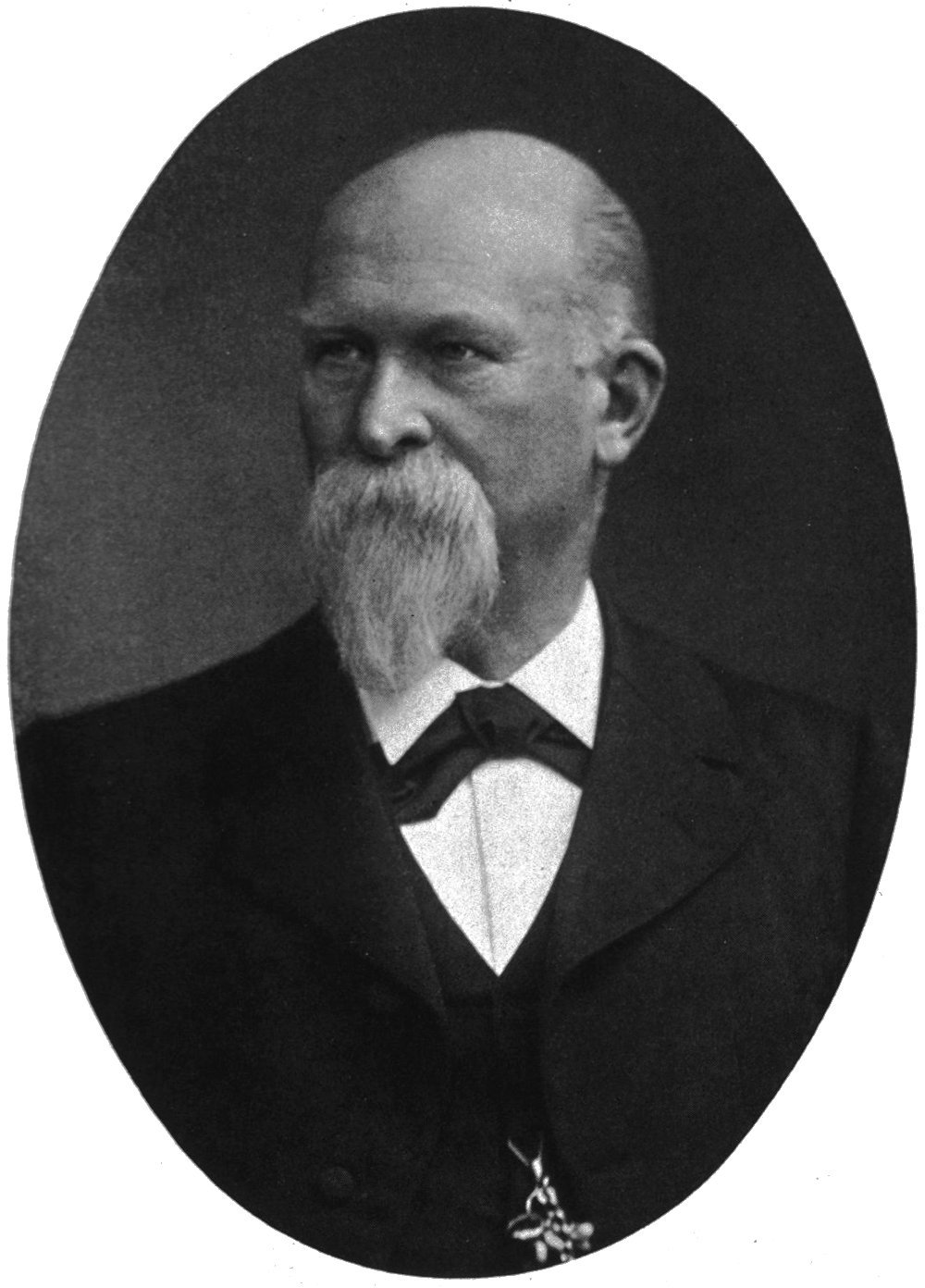
Franz König

König's syndrome (synonym ileocaecal valve syndrome) is a syndrome of abdominal pain in relation to meals, constipation alternated with diarrhea, meteorism, gurgling sounds (hyper-peristalsis) on auscultation (especially in the right iliac fossa), and abdominal distension.

It is caused by an incomplete obstruction of the small intestine and especially of the ileocecal valve, e.g. in Crohn's disease, or in rare cases of cancer of the small intestine.

It is named after the German surgeon Franz König (1832–1910), and should not be confused with König's disease, also named after him.
