= Anchor losses =

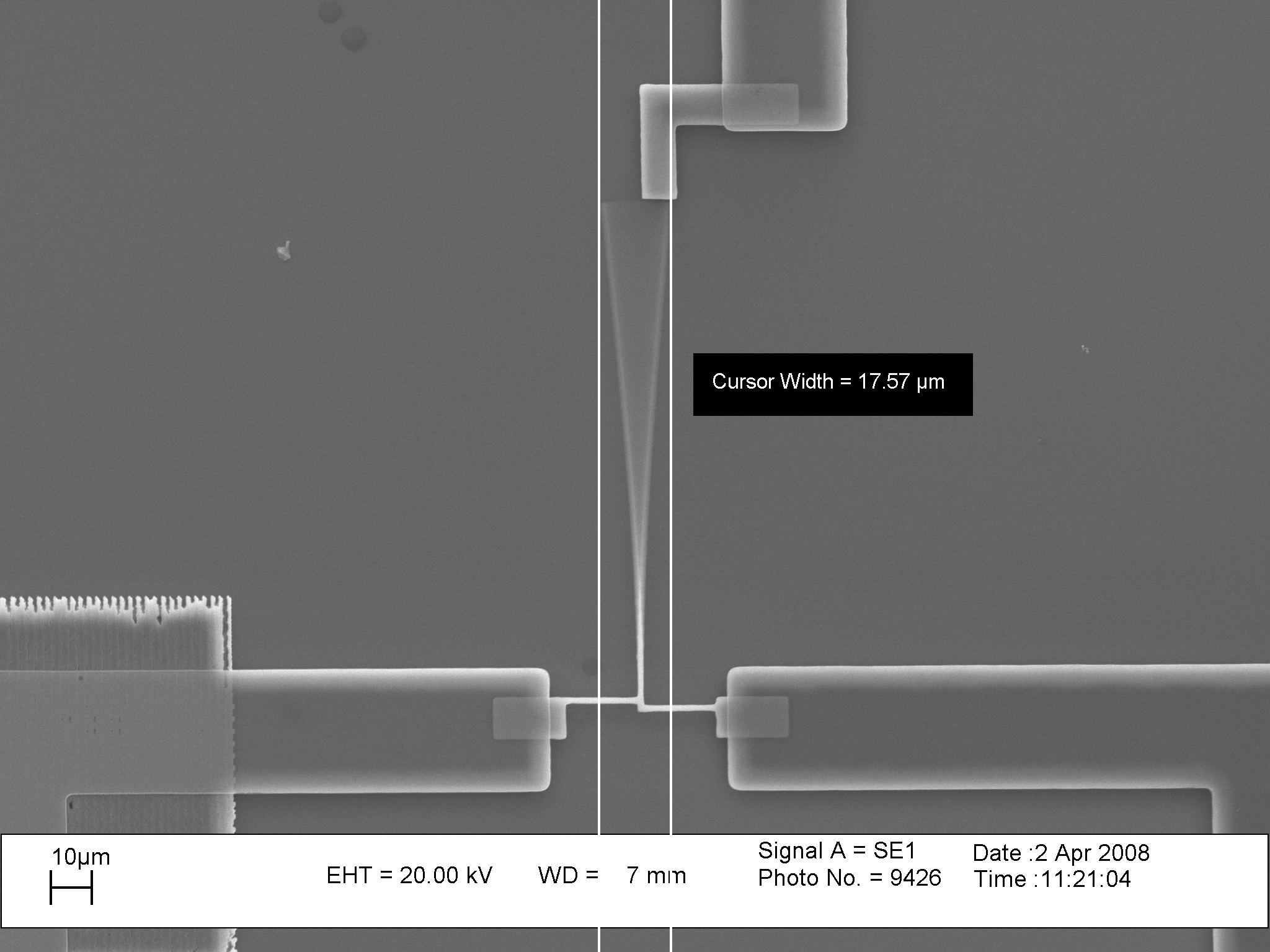
Mems microcantilever in resonance

Anchor losses are a type of damping commonly highlighted in micro-resonators. They refer to the phenomenon where energy is dissipated as mechanical waves from the resonator attenuate into the substrate.

== Introduction ==
In physical systems, damping is the loss of energy of an oscillating system by dissipation. In the field of micro-electro-mechanicals, the damping is usually measured by a dimensionless parameter Q factor (Quality factor). A higher Q factor indicates lower damping and reduced energy dissipation, which is desirable for micro-resonators as it leads to lower energy consumption, better accuracy and efficiency, and reduced noise.

Several factors contribute to the damping of micro-electro-mechanical resonators, including fluid damping and solid damping. Anchor losses are a type of solid damping observed in resonators operating in various environments. When a resonator is fixed to a substrate, either directly or via other structures such as tethers, mechanical waves propagate into the substrate through these connections. The wave traveling through a perfectly elastic solid would have a constant energy and an isolated perfectly elastic solid once set into vibration would continue to vibrate indefinitely. Actual materials do not show such behavior and dissipation will happen due to some imperfection of elasticity within the body. In typical micro-resonators, the substrate dimensions are significantly larger than those of the resonator itself. Consequently, it can be approximated that all waves entering the substrate will attenuate without reflecting back to the resonator. In other words, the energy carried by the waves will dissipate, leading to damping. This phenomenon is referred to as anchor losses.

== Estimation of anchor losses ==
=== Analytical estimation ===
Standard theories of structural mechanics permit the expression of concentrated forces and couples exerted by the structure on the support. These generally include a constant component (due, for instance, to pre-stresses or initial deformation) and a sinusoidal varying contribution. Some researchers have investigated some simple geometries following this idea, and one example is the anchor losses of a cantilever beam connected to a 3-D semi-infinite region:

$Q_{anchor}\approx C \left ( \frac{L}{W} \right )\left ( \frac{L}{H} \right )^4$

where L is the length of the beam, H is the in-plane (curvature plane) thickness, W is the out-of-plane thickness, C is a constant depending on the Poisson's coefficient, with C = 3.45 for ν = 0.25, C = 3.23 for ν = 0.3, C = 3.175 for ν = 0.33.

=== Numerical estimation ===
Numerical simulation of wave attenuation in a substrate induced by a cantilever beam with surrounding PMLs

Due to the complexity of geometries and the anisotropy or inhomogeneities of materials, usually it is difficult to use analytical method to estimate the anchor losses of some devices. Numerical methods are more widely applied for this issue. An artificial boundary or an artificial absorbing layer is applied to the numerical model to prevent the wave reflection. One such method is the perfectly matched layer, initially developed for electromagnetic wave transmission and later adapted for solid mechanics. Perfectly matched layers act as special elements where wave attenuation occurs through a complex coordinate transformation, ensuring all waves entering the layer are absorbed, thus simulating anchor losses.

To determine the Q factor from a Finite Element Method model with perfectly matched layers, two common approaches are used:

- Using the complex eigenfrequency from a modal analysis:

$Q=\frac{Re(\omega)}{2Im(\omega)}$

where $Re(\omega)$ and $Im(\omega)$ is the real and imaginary part of the complex eigenfrequency.

- Generating the frequency response from a frequency domain analysis and applying methods such as the half-bandwidth method to calculate the Q factor.

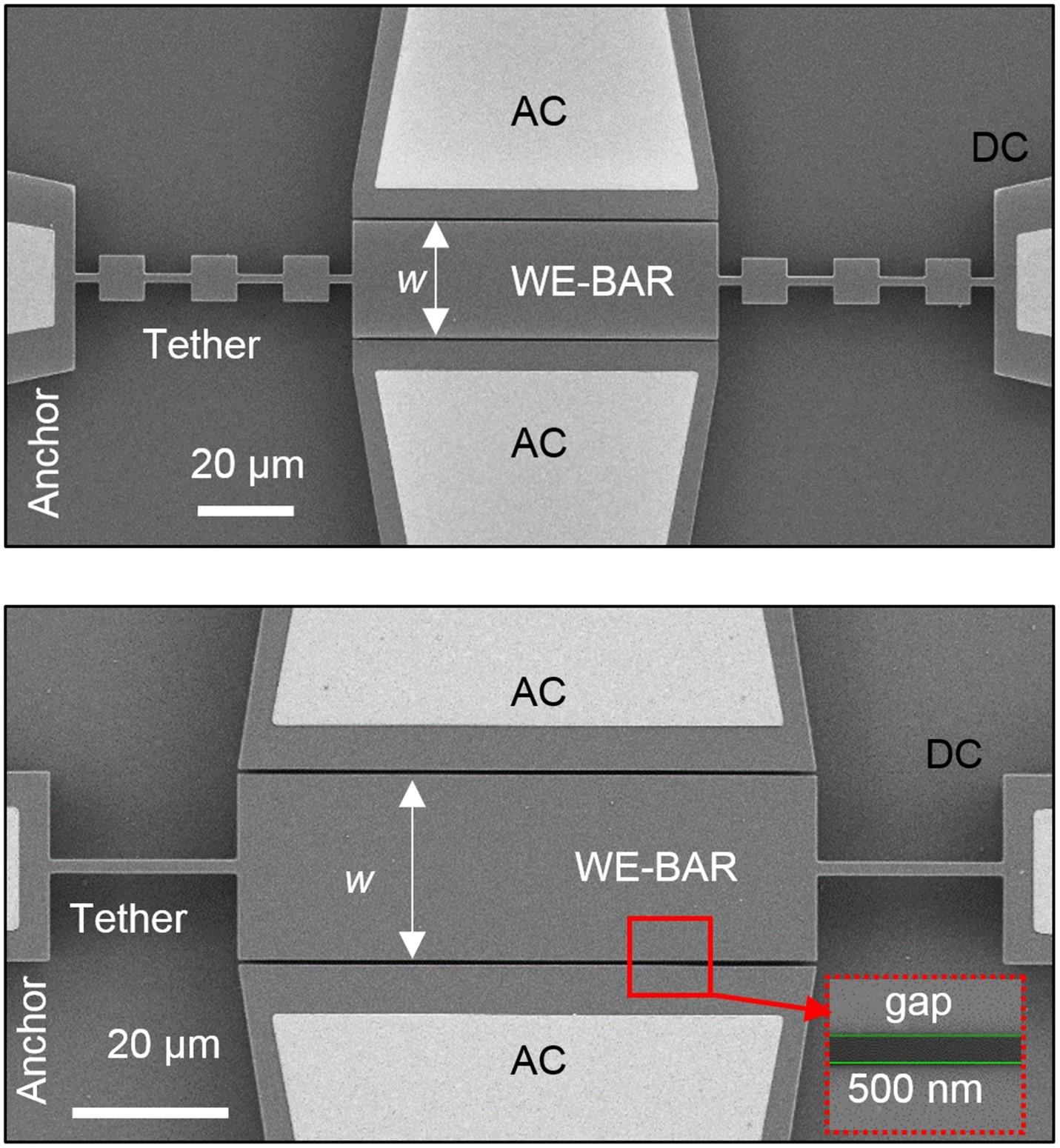
Different tether configurations for a capacitive resonator

== Methods to mitigate anchor losses ==
Anchor losses are highly dependent on the geometry of the resonator. How to anchor the resonator or the size of the tether has a strong effect on the anchor losses. Some common methods to eliminate anchor losses are summarized as followings.

=== Anchor at nodal points ===
A common method is to fix the resonator at the nodal points, where the motion amplitude is minimum. From the definitions of anchor losses, now the wave magnitude into the substrate will be minimized and less energy will dissipate. However, this method may not apply to certain resonators, in which the nodal points are not around the resonator edges, causing difficulty in tether designs.

=== Quarter wavelength tethers ===
Quarter wavelength tether is an effective approach to minimize the energy loss through these tethers. Similar to the theory used for transmission lines, quarter wavelength tether is assumed as the best acoustic isolation, since the complete in phase reflection occurs as the tether length equals to a quarter acoustic wavelength, or λ/4. Therefore, there is hardly any energy dissipation to the substrate through the tethers. However, quarter-wavelength design results in extremely long tether structures, usually in tens to hundreds of micrometers, which is counter to minimization and leads to a decrease in the mechanical stability of the devices.

=== Material-mismatched support ===
The resonator structure and anchoring stem are made with different materials. The acoustic impedance mismatch between these two suppresses the energy from the resonator to the stem, thus reducing anchor losses and allowing high Q factor.

=== Acoustic reflection cavity ===
The basic mechanism is to reflect back a portion of the elastic waves at the anchor boundary due to the discontinuity in the acoustic impedance caused by the acoustic cavity (the etching trenches).

=== Phonon crystal tether and metamaterial ===
Phonon crystal tether is a promising way to restrain the acoustic wave propagation in the supporting tethers, since they can arouse complete band gaps in which the transmissions of the elastic waves are prohibited. Thus, the vibration energy is retained in the resonator body, reducing the anchor losses into the substrate. Besides the phonon crystal tether, some other kinds of metamaterial could be applied to the anchor and surrounding regions to prohibit the wave transmission. A key drawback of this method is the challenge to the fabrication process.

=== Optimized anchor geometry ===
Anchor losses are highly sensitive to the geometry of the anchors. Features such as fillets, curvature, sidewall inclination, and other detailed geometric aspects can affect anchor losses. By carefully optimizing these geometric configurations, anchor losses can be significantly reduced.

== See also ==
- Dynamical systems theory
- Finite element method
- Finite-difference time-domain method
- Micro-Electro-Mechanical Systems
- Resonator
- Infinite element method
