= Loubignac iteration =

In applied mathematics, Loubignac iteration is an iterative method in finite element methods. It gives continuous stress field. It is named after Gilles Loubignac, who published the method in 1977.
