= SAMCEF =

SAMCEF is a finite element analysis (FEA) software package dedicated to mechanical virtual prototyping. SAMCEF development started in 1965 at the Aerospace Laboratory of University of Liège. It was developed and sold by SAMTECH, a Belgian company, founded in 1986 and located in Liège, Belgium. SAMTECH s.a. was acquired by LMS in 2011.

LMS was acquired by Siemens in 2013. SAMCEF is now part of Siemens Simulation Software Simcenter.

== Software features ==
SAMCEF software package is made of several modules that can be used and bought independently from one another.

SAMCEF Field is the package's graphical user interface (GUI) where users will define their models based on CAD geometry. SAMCEF Field is able to drive all SAMCEF solvers modules within the same environment, making it easy for users to investigate different aspects of the case he is studying without having to learn new ways of doing it for each of them.

Here is the list of the most important modules available:

- SAMCEF Linear: dedicated to linear analysis, including linear static (SAMCEF Asef), modal analysis (SAMCEF Dynam), response to harmonic forces (SAMCEF Repdyn), Buckling stability (SAMCEF Stabi) and response to random vibrations (SAMCEF Spectral)
- SAMCEF Mecano - Non Linear static and dynamic analysis (implicit formulation) with the unique ability to enable the integration of MBS (Multi Body Simulation) features in the models, mostly kinematic joints like hinges, sliders...
- SAMCEF Thermal - Linear and Non Linear, transient and steady state thermal analysis, including conduction, convection, radiations and potentially thermal ablation (SAMCEF Amaryllis)
- BOSS Quattro - Parametric Applications Manager and Multi Disciplinary Optimization

SAMCEF modules are also used as the foundation for solutions dedicated to specific industries. In that case, users can use SAMCEF products inside environments dedicated to their specific applications:

- S4WT (SAMCEF For Wind Turbines): dedicated to basic and advanced design and load computations inside Wind Turbines.
- S4PL&S (SAMCEF For Powerlines and Substations): dedicated to the design of electrical transport devices, including computations of the effects of wind, frost and short circuits.
- S4R (SAMCEF For Rotors): dedicated to the study of fast rotating machines, including Campbell diagrams computations, blades loss, engine start-up... based on 1D, 2D and 3D Finite Elements.
