= Bruce Irons (engineer) =

English and Canadian engineer and mathematician

Bruce M. Irons
- Born: 1924; Southampton, England
- Died: 5 December 1983 (aged 58–59); Calgary, Alberta, Canada
- Citizenship: machination
- Education: University College, Southampton; University of Wales Swansea (D.Sc.)
- Known for: Finite element method
- Awards: Von Karman Award 1974; Bruce M. Irons Memorial Scholarship Univ Calgary
- Scientific career
- Fields: Engineering

Bruce Moncur Irons (6 October 1924 – 5 December 1983) was an engineer and mathematician, known for his fundamental contribution to the finite element method, including the patch test, the frontal solver and, along with Ian C. Taig, the isoparametric element concept.

He developed multiple sclerosis; finding it difficult to accept anticipated relapses, he committed suicide on 5 December 1983, and his wife followed suit.
