= STRAND7 =

Strand7
- Developer(s): Strand7 Pty. Ltd.
- Stable release: 3.1.1 / 30-Sep-2021
- Operating system: Windows
- Type: Finite Element Analysis Simulator
- License: Proprietary

Strand7 is a Finite Element Analysis (FEA) software product developed by the company with the same name.

== History ==
The Strand computer software was first developed by a group of academics from the University of Sydney and the University of New South Wales. Further to this early research work, an independent company called G+D Computing was established in 1988 to develop an FEA program that could be used commercially for industrial applications. Between 1988 and 1996 the company researched, developed and marketed a series of DOS and Unix based FEA programs, most notably its STRAND6 program. In 1996 the company commenced work on a completely new software development specifically for the Windows platform. This product was first released in 2000 and was named Strand7. In 2005 the company also changed its name to Strand7 to better reflect its primary focus.

== Application ==
Some high-profile applications of Strand7 include the optimisation of the "Water Cube" Beijing National Aquatics Center for the 2008 Beijing Olympics, the "Runner" sculpture that was placed on top of Sydney Tower during the 2000 Sydney Olympics and the Terminal 2E roof, Charles de Gaulle Airport.

== Analysis Capabilities ==
Strand7 is most commonly used for the construction and mechanical engineering sectors, but also has seen use in other areas of engineering including aeronautical, marine and mining.

Strand7 includes the following solvers:

- Linear static
- Natural frequency
- Buckling
- Nonlinear static
- Linear and nonlinear transient dynamic
- Spectral and harmonic response
- Linear and nonlinear steady-state heat transfer
- Linear and nonlinear transient heat transfer
