= Infinite element method =

The infinite element method is a numerical method for solving problems of engineering and mathematical physics. It is a modification of finite element method. The method divides the domain concerned into sections of infinite length. In contrast with a finite element which is approximated by polynomial expressions on a finite support, the unbounded length of the infinite element is fitted with functions allowing the evaluation of the field at the asymptote. The number of functions and points of interpolations define the accuracy of the element in the infinite direction. The method is commonly used to solve acoustic problems and allows to respect the Sommerfeld condition of non-return of the acoustic waves and the diffusion of the pressure waves in the far field.
