= Barna Szabó =

Hungarian-born engineer (born 1935)

Barna Aladár Szabó
- Born: September 21, 1935 (age 90); Martonvásár, Hungary
- Known for: the p-version of the Finite Element Method
- Scientific career
- Fields: Predictive Computational Science, Finite Element Method
- Workplaces: Washington University in St. Louis, State University of New York at Buffalo

Barna A. Szabó (born September 21, 1935) is a Hungarian-American engineer and educator, noted for his contributions on the finite element method, particularly the conception and implementation of the p- and hp-versions of the finite element method. He is a founding member and fellow of the United States Association for Computational Mechanics, an external member of the Hungarian Academy of Sciences and fellow of the St. Louis Academy of Sciences.

== Life ==
Barna Aladár Szabó was born in Martonvásár, Hungary, the son of József and Gizella (Iványi) Szabó. After graduating from the Franciscan High School in Esztergom in 1954, he was admitted to the Faculty of Mining Engineering of the Technical University of Heavy Industry in Miskolc (now University of Miskolc). Following the failed Hungarian uprising in 1956 he emigrated to Canada, where he resumed his undergraduate studies at the University of Toronto, receiving his Bachelor of Science in 1960. In 1963 he began part-time studies at the State University of New York at Buffalo, where he received his Master of Science degree in Civil Engineering in 1966 and later his Doctorate of Philosophy in 1968. His ideas on using high order polynomials in the Finite Element Method for controlling errors of discretization were outlined in his dissertation.

== Work ==
Szabó's began his professional career as a mining engineer at International Nickel Company of Canada (INCO) in Thompson, Manitoba in 1960. He subsequently joined Acres Consulting Services Ltd., in Niagara Falls, Ontario. Between 1966 and 1966 he pursued doctoral studies at the State University of New York at Buffalo while serving as instructor. In 1968 he was appointed to the faculty of the School of Engineering and Applied Science of Washington University in St. Louis. He was named The Albert P. and Blanche Y. Greensfelder Professor of Mechanics in 1975 and appointed Director of the Center for Computational Mechanics (CCM) in 1977, positions he held until his retirement in 2006. Work at CCM focused on what later became known as the p-version of the finite element method. In order to facilitate the transition of the results of his research to professional practice, Washington University, together with outside investors, formed Noetic Technologies Corporation. Noetic's software product PROBE was designed to support strength calculations in connection with the design and certification of aerospace structures. Noetic Technologies was acquired by the MacNeal-Schwendler Corporation of Pasadena, California in 1989. In 1989 Szabó co-founded Engineering Software Research and Development, Inc. (ESRD). He served as its president until 2011. ESRD's software product StressCheck is the first commercial finite element software product designed to support verification and validation in computational solid mechanics. Szabó introduced the concept of Simulation Governance in 2011, the importance of which is now generally recognized.

== Publications ==
Szabó is the principal author of three textbooks on the Finite Element Method:

- Szabó B.A. and Babuška I. Finite Element Analysis. John Wiley & Sons: New York, 1991.
- Szabó B.A. and Babuška I. Introduction to Finite Element Analysis: Formulation, Verification and Validation. John Wiley & Sons: Chichester, 2011. Chinese translation: 2013.
- Szabó B.A. and Babuška I. Finite Element Analysis: Method, Verification and Validation. 2nd edition, John Wiley & Sons, Inc. Hoboken NJ 2021.

He published over 200 technical papers on the finite element method, its applications in the field of solid mechanics, and the formulation and validation of mathematical models.

An autobiographical work, entitled “On Being 85 Years Young” is available in PDF format through the Hungarian Electronic Library (Magyar Elektronikus Könyvtár)

Szabó also authored a more recent technical work aimed at bridging advanced finite element analysis theory with modern numerical simulation practice:

- Bridging the Gap: Advancing Finite Element Analysis in Numerical Simulation. Independently published (Amazon Kindle Direct Publishing), 2026.

== Honors ==
- Fellow, United States Association for Computational Mechanics, 1970
- Outstanding Engineer in Education, Missouri Society of Professional Engineers, 1985
- External Member of the Hungarian Academy of Sciences, 1995
- Doctor honoris causa, University of Miskolc, Hungary, 1998
- Szabó was honored on the occasion of his 65th birthday by an international conference held in St. Louis in 2000, "p-FEM2000—International Conference on p and hp Finite Element Methods: Mathematics and Engineering Practice". Two journals issued special editions in connection with that conference. He was similarly honored by scientific meetings organized by the Miskolc Academic Committee on the occasions of his 70th 75th and 80th birthdays
- Honorary Citizenship, Martonvásár, 2015
