= Tau Toolbox =

- Stable release: 0.97 / 29 September 2026; 51 days ago
- Operating system: Linux, Unix, macOS, Windows
- Available in: MATLAB / GNU Octave, Python
- Type: Numerical software
- License: LGL 2.1 GNU Lesser General Public License
- Website: cmup.fc.up.pt/tautoolbox
- Repository: bitbucket.org/tautoolbox/tautoolbox/

Tau Toolbox is a mathematical software library for solving differential, integral, integro-differential, and related functional problems using the Lanczos Tau method. Implementations are available for Python, MATLAB, and GNU Octave.

The toolbox uses an object-oriented framework in which smooth functions are represented by finite expansions in polynomial bases. These polynomial representations can be evaluated and manipulated using operations resembling conventional mathematical notation. Arithmetic operators combine function approximations, while differentiation, integration, and other transformations produce new polynomial objects.

The mathematical framework is based on spectral representations of functions in polynomial families satisfying three-term recurrence relations. These relations are used to construct matrix representations of operations such as multiplication, differentiation, and integration. Supported bases include Bessel, Chebyshev, Gegenbauer, Hermite, Laguerre, and Legendre polynomials, as well as the standard power basis.

The toolbox has been applied to differential eigenvalue problems,. partial differential equations, Integro-differential equations, first-kind Integral equations, and functional differential equations,.

== Components ==
Tau Toolbox is organized around two principal components: the polynomial module, which provides the underlying polynomial approximation framework, and the tau module, which implements spectral Tau methods for solving operator equations.

=== polynomial ===
The polynomial component is distributed as a self-contained Python module and provides polynomial approximation and numerical operations on functions. Although developed as the approximation framework underlying Tau Toolbox, it can also be used independently.

Its principal classes are:

- Polynomial1, which represents smooth scalar-valued or vector-valued functions of one variable.
- Polynomial2, which represents smooth functions of two variables using low-rank combinations of Polynomial1 objects. This data-sparse representation can reduce the storage and computational costs of two-dimensional polynomial approximations.
- T3Basis, which implements polynomial bases satisfying a three-term recurrence relation. Available bases include Bessel, Chebyshev, Gegenbauer, Hermite, Laguerre, and Legendre polynomials, together with the standard power basis.

The module supports polynomial fitting, evaluation, arithmetic, differentiation, integration, and conversion between polynomial bases.

=== tau ===
The tau component implements spectral Tau methods for differential, integral, integro-differential, and related operator problems. It uses the classes provided by polynomial to represent problem data and approximate solutions.

In this component:

- functions and approximate solutions are represented as polynomial expansions;
- differentiation, integration, and multiplication are performed through operations on polynomial coefficients;
- operational matrices are constructed from the three-term recurrence relation associated with the selected polynomial basis; and
- the polynomial family and approximation domain can be changed without altering the general formulation of the numerical problem.

This separation allows the polynomial approximation framework to be used independently while providing the tau component with a common representation for constructing and solving spectral discretizations.

== Examples ==
=== Python ===
Solve $\int_0^\pi e^{s cos(t)} x(t) dt=\frac{2\sinh(s)}{s}$, $s\in [0, \pi/2]$.

First just get the required packages:

import matplotlib.pyplot as plt
import numpy as np
from numpy import pi
from tautoolbox import tau
from tautoolbox.functions import cos, exp, sin, sinh

Specify the Fredholm integral problem:

equation = [
    lambda t, y: y.fred(lambda s, t: exp(s * cos(t)), domain=[0, pi / 2]),
    lambda s: 2 * sinh(s) / s,
]
problem = tau.problem(equation, domain=[0, pi])

Solve the problem:

seed = 0  # ensure deterministic output by setting the seed
p1, info1 = tau.solve(problem, alpha=0.01, rng=np.random.default_rng(seed))
p2, info2 = tau.solve(problem, method="tr", alpha=0.01, rng=np.random.default_rng(seed))

Evaluate Relative Errors:

f = tau.polynomial(sin, domain=problem.domain)
rel_error_TSVE = (p1 - f).norm() / f.norm()
rel_error_tikhonov = (p2 - f).norm() / f.norm()
print(f"TSVE:                    relative error {rel_error_TSVE:.2%}")
print(f"Tikhonov regularization: relative error {rel_error_tikhonov:.2%}")

Visualize the exact solution alongside both numerical solutions:

fig = plt.figure(figsize=(8, 5))
plt.title("Baart problem")
f.plot(label="exact")
p1.plot(label="TSVE")
p2.plot(label="Tikhonov")
plt.xlabel("$x$")
plt.ylabel("$y(x)$")
plt.grid(True)
plt.legend()
plt.show()

Solution of the problem with TauToolbox

=== MATLAB/Octave ===
Solve $10^{-7}y''-2x(\cos(x)-0.8)y'+ (\cos(x)-0.8)y$, on $[-1, 1]$, $y(-1)=y(1)= 1$.

Set the problem

equation = @(x,y) 1e-7*diff(y, 2)-2*x*(cos(x)-0.8)*diff(y)+(cos(x)-0.8)*y;
domain = [-1 1];
conditions = @(y) {y(-1) - 1; y(1) - 1};
options = tau.settings('degree', 100, 'pieces', 50, 'basis', 'LegendreP');
problem = tau.problem(equation, domain, conditions, options);

Solve via Tau method:

[yn, info] = tau.solve(problem);
plot(yn);

Solution of the problem with TauToolbox

== See also ==
- Chebfun (Chebfun)
