= Yuri Ryzhov (physicist) =

- Юрий Рыжов
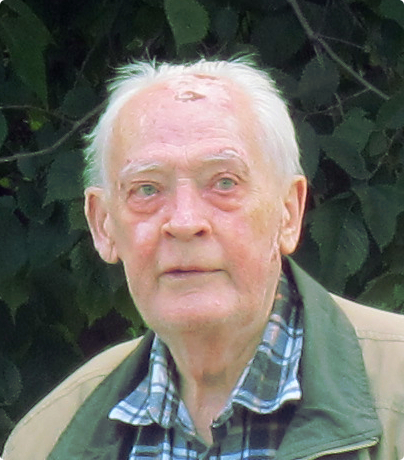
- Ryzhov in 2015
- Born: Yuri Alekseyevich Ryzhov; 28 October 1930; Moscow, Russian SFSR, Soviet Union
- Died: 29 July 2017 (aged 86); Moscow, Russia
- Citizenship: USSR; Russia
- Education: Moscow Institute of Physics and Technology

Yuri Alekseyevich Ryzhov (Russian: Ю́рий Алексе́евич Рыжо́в; 28 October 1930 – 29 July 2017) was a Soviet and Russian scientist in the field of fluid dynamics, political and social activist, diplomat, Doctor of Technical Sciences (1970), member of the Russian Academy of Sciences (Academician since 1987; Corresponding Member since 1981), former Russian Ambassador to France (1992-1998).

== Biography ==
Grew up in central Moscow's Arbat District, where he attended local high school No. 59.

In 1954 graduated from Moscow Institute of Physics and Technology with a degree in Aeromechanics.

While still an undergraduate he began his collaboration with TsAGI (Central Aerohydrodynamics Institute in Zhukovsky) where he conducted research on experimental and theoretical thermodynamics of air-to-air and surface-to-air missiles until 1958.

In 1958, following an invitation by academician Georgy Petrov, Ryzhov joins the Keldysh Research Centre (at the time known as NII-1); here his work focused on high speed aerodynamics.

In 1961-1992 and since 1999 he has worked at the Moscow Aviation Institute: docent, professor, pro-rector, rector (1986-1992), head of the aerodynamics department since 2003.

1960-1990: Member of the Communist Party of the Soviet Union.

1987-1990: Deputy of the Moscow City Council, also known as Mossoviet.

1989-1992: Deputy of the Congress of People's Deputies of the Soviet Union.

1989-1991: Member of the Presidium of the Supreme Soviet of the Soviet Union, chairman of the Supreme Soviet's Committee for Science and Technology. One of the organizers of the Inter-regional Deputies' Group, the first legal parliamentary opposition in the Soviet Union.

1990-1991: Senior deputy chairman of the Higher political advisory council to the Chairman of the Supreme Soviet of RSFSR.

1991: Chairman of the Committee for Science, Technology and Education at the Soviet of the Union of the Supreme Soviet of USSR; member of the Political advisory council to the President of USSR.

According to the Soviet and Russian journalist and statesman Mikhail Poltoranin, Ryzhov was offered the post of Prime Minister during Boris Yeltsin's time in office, but had turned it down.

1992-1998: Ambassador of the Russian Federation to France.

1992-1993: Member of the President's Advisory Council of the Russian Federation; since 1993: Member of the President's Council of the Russian Federation.

2001-2012: Chairman of the Russian Pugwash Committee at the Presidium of the Russian Academy of Sciences.

2002-2013: Member of the Council of the Pugwash Conferences on Science and World Affairs.

Chairman of the "History of World Culture" Research Council at the Russian Academy of Sciences, chairman of the judging panel at the "Triumph-Science" independent prize for the encouragement of achievements in science, member of the Public Committee for the Protection of Scientists, member of the Russian National Committee on Theoretical and Applied Mechanics, supervisory board member of the INDEM Foundation, member of the Council on Foreign and Defense Policy. Was on the inaugural board of the Moskovskiye Novosti Newspaper.

== Field of scientific research ==
Yuri Ryzhov's main works are in the fields of supersonic aerodynamics, rarefied-gas dynamics, interaction of atomic scale particles with surfaces, non-equilibrium processes in gas flows, non-stationary heat transfer.

== Political position in recent years ==
In 2014 he was among the 31 signatories of a declaration, dedicated to the September 21st Peace March, demanding "to end the aggressive reckless venture: to withdraw Russian troops from the territory of Ukraine and to stop providing propaganda, material and military support to the separatists in the South-East of Ukraine".

He was a critic and opponent of the regime of President Vladimir Putin.

== Awards ==
- Order "For Merit to the Fatherland", III Class (April 5th, 1999) – for services to the state and significant contribution to the implementation of Russia’s foreign policy course.
- Medal "Defender of a Free Russia" (August 20th, 1997) – for carrying out his civil duty while defending democracy and constitutional order on the 19-21 of August 1991.
