= Boris Galerkin =

Russian mathematician

- Бори́с Григо́рьевич Галёркин
- Born: Boris Grigoryevich Galerkin; 4 March 1871; Polotsk, Vitebsk Governorate, Russian Empire
- Died: 12 July 1945 (aged 74); Moscow, Soviet Union
- Education: Saint Petersburg State Institute of Technology
- Known for: Galerkin method
- Spouse: Revekka Treivas
- Scientific career
- Fields: Applied mathematics; Structural mechanics
- Workplaces: Military Engineering-Technical University

Boris Grigoryevich Galerkin (Russian: Бори́с Григо́рьевич Галёркин, surname more accurately romanized as Galyorkin; 4 March [O.S. 20 February] 1871–12 July 1945) was a Soviet mathematician and an engineer.

== Biography ==
=== Early life ===
Galerkin was born on 4 March [O.S. 20 February] 1871 in Polotsk, Vitebsk Governorate, Russian Empire, now part of Belarus, to Jewish parents, Girsh-Shleym (Hirsh-Shleym) Galerkin and Perla Basia Galerkina. His parents owned a house in the town, but the home-craft they made did not bring in enough money, so at the age of 12, Boris started working as a calligrapher in the court. He had finished school in Polotsk but still needed the exams from an additional year to grant him the right to continue education at a higher level. He passed those in Minsk in 1893 as an external student. The same year he was enrolled at St. Petersburg Technological Institute's mechanics department. Due to the lack of funds, Boris Grigoryevich had to combine studying at the institute with working as a draftsman and giving private lessons. At some point, he married Revekka Treivas, a second niece. They did not have children.

=== Academic life ===
Galerkin's first scientific work was published by the institute "Transactions". The article was titled "A theory of longitudinal curving and an experience of longitudinal curving theory application to many-storied frames, frames with rigid junctions and frame systems". He wrote it while in the "Kresty" prison. In the summer of 1909, Boris Grigoryevich went abroad to see constructions and buildings which interested him. During the next four years, i.e., before World War I, he and many other institute staff visited Europe to stimulate their scientific interests. Galerkin visited Germany, Austria, Switzerland, Belgium, and Sweden.

Galerkin taught students in the mechanical department structural mechanics, i.e., conducted exercises and designing. The lecturer was professor V.L.Kirpichov - a scientist in the field of mechanics and the head of the Petersburg Mechanical Scientific School. However, most members also worked in the Polytechnical Institute, including Ivan Bubnov, A.N. Krylov, I.V. Meshcherskiy, and S.P. Timoshenko.

In the autumn of 1911, Galerkin also worked at the Women's Polytechnical Institute. In 1913, he worked on the design of the metallic frame for a boiler power plant in St. Petersburg - the first building with metallic frame under big loads in Russia. Later it was considered to be one of Europe's unique engineering objects. Galerkin regularly published his works in the institutes "Transactions", and since 1915 - also in Engineering News. Before 1915, pivot systems were at the center of his scientific interest; later he started researching plates.

In 1915, Galerkin published an article in which he put forward an idea of an approximate method for differential equations, in particular boundary value problems. He applied his method to a big number of pivot and plate analysis problems. Sometime before, I.G.Bubnov developed a similar approach for the variational problem solution, which he interpreted as a variant of the Ritz method algorithm. The distinguishing features of Galerkin's method were the following: he did not associate the method, developed by him, with any variational problem direct solution, but considered it to be common for solving differential equations. He interpreted it, using the probable displacements principle. These ideas proved to be very productive, not only in structural mechanics but for mathematical physics at large.

The Galerkin method (or Bubnov-Galerkin method) with Galerkin's (or "weak") differential equations problem statement form are known all over the world. Today, they provide a foundation for algorithms in the fields of mechanics, thermodynamics, electromagnetism, hydrodynamics, and many others.

In January 1919, Galerkin became a professor in the 2nd (formerly Women's) Polytechnical Institute, remaining a teacher of structural mechanics in the 1st Polytechnical Institute (at that time the Polytechnical Institute was named so) mechanical department. In March 1920, a professor chair in structural mechanics was established at the department, and Galerkin won it in a competition. In the summer of 1921, S.P. Belzetskiy, a famous scientist in the field of structural mechanics and theory of elasticity, who was holding a similar chair at the civil engineering faculty, emigrated to Poland. Galerkin took part in a competition for his chair and at the beginning of 1922, he left the mechanical faculty for the civil engineering faculty, which was nearer to him in his scientific and engineering activities.

From 1917 to 1919, Galerkin published a series of works on rectangular and triangular plates curving in scientific periodicals and in the "Russian Academy of Sciences Transactions". Later he took a break from publications, and only in 1922 he began publishing again, but only in foreign magazines (in the Soviet Union there was not enough paper for scientific literature).

In December 1923, Galerkin was elected dean of the Polytechnical Institutes' civil engineering faculty. It happened during a very important period of the institute's history, when a group of deans resigned from their posts, protesting from the unceremonious intervention of so-called "student' representatives", controlled by the trade unions and the Communist party committees, into the educational process. Galerkin proved to be a talented leader of the faculty. He managed to neutralize overly active "assistants", who were appointed against his will, and he did not hurry to fulfill the orders of incompetent leaders who were conducting infinite experiments at the higher school at that time. From 1924 to 1929, Galerkin was also a professor in the Railway Engineers Institute and at St. Petersburg University. In 1924 he made his last trip abroad to participate in the Congress on applied mechanics in the Netherlands.

In the spring of 1926, Galerkin learned that Narkompros (Ministry of education) had adopted a decision to close the road-making section at his faculty. This decision was prepared and adopted secretly by the dean of the Institute Communist party committee in the connection with the company on the elimination of parallel specialties. Meanwhile, there were no other faculties in the country training specialists in the construction of electrified railways, urban railways, and subways (the faculty had worked on this since 1907). Galerkin managed to cancel this rash decision by Moscow. During the period of Galerkin at the dean's post, the first laboratory at the faculty was created. He also managed to receive governmental approval for the idea to build some other big laboratories for the faculty (the Hydrotechnical Research Institute was later established on their base).

In January 1928, Galerkin was appointed as a corresponding member-elected of the USSR Academy of sciences. His candidature was nominated by academicians A.F. Yoffe (Abram Ioffe), A.N. Krylov, and P.P. Lazarev. In October 1929, he left the dean's post. After this, the civil engineering faculty was divided into two parts: the hydrotechnical and irrigation sections became the water industry faculty and the rest became a part of the civil engineering faculty. was soon left out of the Polytechnical Institute and became the Civil and Industrial Engineering Institute, which however does not exist anymore. The water industry faculty soon became the Hydrotechnical institute. Galerkin was a professor at both institutes.

By the 1920s, Galerkin was already a world-famous scientist. He had become an authority among engineers. He was often recruited as a consultant to the designing and construction of serious industrial objects in northwest Russia (heat power plants, Volkhov hydro power plant, Kondopoga pulp, paper mill, and others). He was a member of the technical councils of the designing institutes Gipromez and Giprotsvetmet, a member of the academic councils of the research institutes: Irrigation Institute (later–Hydrotechnical Research Institute), and the Institute of Structures. After the end of the Dnieper Hydroelectric Station construction, Boris Grigoryevich also became a member of the governmental commission.

In 1934, Galerkin got two doctoral degrees in technics and mathematics and the Honoured Worker in Science and Engineering title. At the beginning of 1936, he was elected a member of the USSR Academy of sciences. He also became a member of the highest Certifying Commission in the State Committee on higher technical education, a chairman of the technical mechanic's group in the USSR Academy of sciences technical section, the headmaster of the USSR Academy of Sciences Institute of Mechanics, the chairman of the Civil engineers scientific society and its Leningrad section. In April 1936, according to a governmental order, Galerkin was appointed chairman of the Governmental Commission for the examination of the Moscow Palace of Soviets steel frame walls and overlappings initial project.

Though having so many titles, Galerkin remained a professor of the structural mechanics and theory of elasticity department at the hydrotechnical faculty (the Hydrotechnical Institute was returned to the Polytechnical (at that time–Industrial) Institute as a faculty in 1934). Mostly he taught the course on the theory of elasticity, which was very difficult for the students of that time, who had very weak training in mathematics. Students were visiting his lectures to look at the "real academician", but he disappointed them. He was short, puny, and had a weak voice. His image did not correspond to the status of a serious scientist with big authority, received from the government. At one time the academician was even pulled out of a tram by other passengers, and after this "accident", the institute administration applied to the authorities for a car.

=== War times and death ===
Galerkin drew in generals uniform in 1939 when the VITU of Navy (previously known as the Nikolaevsky Engineering Academy, now Military engineering-technical university, Russian: Военный инженерно-технический университет), was a revival on the base of Civil and Industrial Engineering Institute, as the head of its structural mechanics department and the academician became a lieutenant general. Boris Grigoryevich had never been in the army before but had to wear the general's uniform. He was shy and when someone saluted him he became frightened and waved his hands.

In the summer of 1941, after the beginning of the war, the Commission on the defensive installations construction was created by the city government. Some academicians and prominent scientists became members (almost everyone was from the Polytechnical Institute), but only Boris Grigoryevich was involved with construction engineering. Practically, he became the supervisor of the work for the commission. Simultaneously, Boris Grigoryevich was the city engineering defense department experts group head.

Later, he was evacuated to Moscow, where he joined the military engineering commission of the Academy of Sciences of the USSR. Hard non-stop work was undermining the scientist's health. Not long after the Great Victory, Galerkin died in Moscow on 12 July 1945. He is buried in the Volkovo Cemetery in St. Petersburg.

== Mathematical contributions ==
Galerkin's name is attached to the finite element method, which is a way to numerically solve partial differential equations.

Galerkin methods include:

- The Galerkin method - A method for approximating the solution to a problem in weak form. Most well-known in the finite element method
- The Petrov–Galerkin method
- The streamline upwind Petrov–Galerkin method (SUPG)
- The Discontinuous Galerkin method
