= Michael Vogelius =

American mathematician (born 1953)

Michael Steenstrup Vogelius (born 1953) is an American mathematician.

== Education ==
Vogelius completed his Ph.D. at the University of Maryland College Park in 1980. His doctoral advisor was Ivo Babuška. His dissertation thesis was titled A Dimensional Reduction Approach to the Solution of Partial Differential Equations.

== Career ==
Vogelius has been a member of the faculty of the Mathematics Department at Rutgers University since 1989. Since 1997, he has supervised the doctoral dissertations of at least six students at the Rutgers University. He has also worked as a Division Director at the National Science Foundation.

== Select bibliography ==
- Analysis of an enhanced approximate cloaking scheme for the conductivity problem.
- Diffusion and Homogenization Limits with Separate Scales
- Approximate Cloaking for the Full Wave Equation via Change of Variables.
- Pointwise polarization tensor bounds, and applications to voltage perturbations caused by thin inhomogeneities.
- An Elliptic Regularity Result for a Composite Medium with "Touching" Fibers of Circular Cross-Section.
