= Simulation governance =

Simulation governance is a managerial function concerned with assurance of reliability of information generated by numerical simulation. The term was introduced in 2011 and specific technical requirements were addressed from the perspective of mechanical design in 2012. Its strategic importance was addressed in 2015. At the 2017 NAFEMS World Congress in Stockholm simulation governance was identified as the first of eight “big issues” in numerical simulation.

Simulation governance is concerned with (a) selection and adoption of the best available simulation technology, (b) formulation of mathematical models, (c) management of experimental data, (d) data and solution verification procedures, and (e) revision of mathematical models in the light of new information collected from physical experiments and field observations.

Plans for simulation governance have to be formulated to fit the mission of each organization or department within an organization: In the terminology of structural and mechanical engineering, typical missions are:

1. Application of established rules of design and certification: Given the allowable value defined in a design rule $F_{all}$, show that $F_{max} \leq F_{all}$.
2. Formulation of design rules (typically for new materials or material systems): What is $F_{all}$? This involves the interpretation of results from coupon tests and component tests.
3. Condition-based maintenance (typically of high-value assets): Given a detected flaw, what is the probability that failure will occur after $N$ load cycles?
4. Structural analysis of large structures (such as airframes, marine structures, automobiles under crash conditions).

Note that items 1 to 3 require strength analysis where the quantities of interest are related to the first derivatives of the displacement field. Item 4 refers to structural analysis where the quantities of interest are force-displacement relations or accelerations (as in crash dynamics). This distinction is important because in strength analysis errors associated with the formulation of mathematical models and their numerical solution, for example by the finite element method, must be treated separately and verification, validation and uncertainty quantification must be applied.

In structural analysis on the other hand, numerical problems, typically constructed by assembling elements from a finite element library, a method known as finite element modeling, can produce satisfactory results. In this case the numerical solution stands on its own, typically it is not an approximation to a well-posed mathematical problem. Therefore, neither solution verification nor model validation can be performed. Satisfactory results can be produced by artful tuning of finite element models with reference to sets of experimental data so that two large errors nearly cancel one another: One error is conceptual: inadmissible data violate basic assumptions in the formulation. The other error is numerical: one or more quantities of interest diverge but the rate of divergence is slow and may not be visible at mesh refinements used in practice.
