= Ivo Babuška =

Czech-American mathematician (1926–2023)

Ivo M. Babuška (22 March 1926 – 12 April 2023) was a Czech-American mathematician, noted for his studies of the finite element method and the proof of the Babuška–Lax–Milgram theorem in partial differential equations. One of the celebrated results in the finite elements is the so-called Ladyzenskaja–Babuška–Brezzi (LBB) condition (also referred to in some literature as Banach–Nečas–Babuška (BNB)), which provides sufficient conditions for a stable mixed formulation. The LBB condition has guided mathematicians and engineers to develop state-of-the-art formulations for many technologically important problems like Darcy flow, Stokes flow, incompressible Navier–Stokes, and nearly incompressible elasticity.

Babuška is also well known for his work on adaptive methods and the p-- and hp--versions of the finite element method. He also developed the mathematical framework for the partition of unity methods.

Babuška was elected as a member of the National Academy of Engineering in 2005 for contributions to the theory and implementation of finite element methods for computer-based engineering analysis and design.

== Biography ==
Ivo Babuška was born on 22 March 1926 in Prague, the son of architect Milan Babuška (who designed the National Technical Museum in Prague) and his wife Marie. He studied civil engineering at the Czech Technical University in Prague, where he received the Dipl. Ing in 1949. In 1951 he received the degree Dr. Tech.; his doctoral dissertation was supervised by Eduard Čech and Vladimír Knichal. From 1949 he studied at Mathematical Institute of the Czechoslovak Academy of Sciences and then was the head of the Department of Partial Differential Equations. In 1955, he received a CSc. (= Ph.D.) in mathematics and in 1960 DSc. in mathematics. He was married to Renata and they had two children, a girl, Lenka and a boy, Vit.

Babuška fled Communist Czechoslovakia in 1968 with barely more than he could carry, following a conference in Western Europe, and emigrated to the United States. After many years as a professor at the University of Maryland, he eventually moved to the University of Texas at Austin where he spent many years at the Oden Institute for Computational Engineering and Sciences. He moved to New Mexico in 2020, following retirement in 2018 at the age of 92.

Babuška died on 12 April 2023, at the age of 97.

== Work ==
Babuška worked in the field of mathematics, applied mathematics, numerical methods, finite element methods, and computational mechanics. In 1968, he became a professor at University of Maryland, College Park in the mathematics department, which is part of the University of Maryland College of Computer, Mathematical, and Natural Sciences. He retired in 1996 as a Distinguished University Professor. In 1989 he co-founded the company ESRD, Inc. which developed the StressCheck finite element software, putting into practice much of Babuška's research and contributions to the finite element method. After his time at the University of Maryland, he moved to the Institute for Computational Engineering and Sciences at the University of Texas at Austin where he held the Robert B. Trull Chair in Engineering. Babuška has published more than 300 papers in refereed journals, more than 70 papers in conference proceedings, and several books. He was an invited speaker at many major international conferences and a member of numerous editorial boards for scientific journals. In 2018 he retired as Professor Emeritus. Among his more than 30 doctoral students are Christoph Schwab and Michael Vogelius.

== Honors ==
Babuška received many honors for his work, including five doctorates honoris causa, member of European Academy of Sciences (2003), Fellow of SIAM and ICAM, the Czechoslovak State prize for Mathematics, the Leroy P. Steele Prize (2012), the Birkhoff Prize (1994), the Humboldt Award of Federal Republic of Germany, the Neuron Prize Czech Republic, Honorary Foreign Member of the Czech Learned Society and the Bolzano Medal. In 2003, asteroid 36060 Babuška was named in his honor by the International Astronomical Union. In 2005, Babuska was awarded the Honorary Medal "De Scientia Et Humanitate Optime Meritis", received the ICAM Congress Medal (Newton Gauss, 2016) and he was elected to the National Academy of Engineering. He was also a member of the Academy of Medicine, Engineering, and Sciences of Texas.

== See also ==
- Discontinuous Galerkin method
- Kahan–Babuška summation
