= Christoph Schwab =

German mathematician

- Born: 14 October 1962 (age 63); Flörsheim am Main, Germany
- Awards: SIAM Fellow (2016); Fulbright Scholarship ERC Advanced Grant (2010) Sacci-Landriani Prize
- Scientific career
- Fields: mathematical analysis, programming of numerical solution, partial differential equation, boundary integral equations
- Institutions: University of Maryland, ETH Zurich
- Thesis: Dimensional Reduction for Elliptic Boundary Value Problems (1989)
- Doctoral advisor: Ivo Babuška

Christoph Schwab (born 14 October 1962 in Flörsheim am Main, Germany) is a German applied mathematician, specializing in numerical analysis of partial differential equations and boundary integral equations.

== Education and career ==
He studied mathematics from 1982 to 1985 at the Technische Universität Darmstadt. By means of a Fulbright Scholarship, from 1985 he studied at the University of Maryland, College Park, where he received his PhD in 1989. His thesis Dimensional Reduction for Elliptic Boundary Value Problems was written under the supervision of Ivo Babuška. Schwab was a postdoc for the academic year 1989–1990 at London's University of Westminster. At the University of Maryland, Baltimore County he was an assistant professor from 1990 to 1995 and was appointed in 1995 an associate professor. At ETH Zurich, Schwab was from 1995 to 1998 an associate professor and is since 1998 a full professor. For the academic year 1993–1994 he was a visiting scientist at the IBM Deutschland Wissenschaftliches Zentrum (IBM German Scientific Center) in Heidelberg.

In his research the central issues are the finite and boundary element methods (BEM) for numerical solutions of partial differential equations in technology, as well as the mathematical analysis of the modeling of physical processes.

In 2002 Schwab was an invited speaker at the International Congress of Mathematicians in Beijing.

== Selected publications ==
=== Articles ===
- Cockburn, Bernardo; Kanschat, Guido; Schötzau, Dominik; Schwab, Christoph (2002). "Local Discontinuous Galerkin Methods for the Stokes System". SIAM Journal on Numerical Analysis. 40: 319–343. doi:10.1137/S0036142900380121. hdl:20.500.11850/145896. S2CID 207077291.
- Houston, Paul; Schwab, Christoph; Süli, Endre (2002). "Discontinuous hp-Finite Element Methods for Advection-Diffusion-Reaction Problems". SIAM Journal on Numerical Analysis. 39 (6): 2133–2163. doi:10.1137/S0036142900374111.
- Frauenfelder, Philipp; Schwab, Christoph; Todor, Radu Alexandru (2005). "Finite elements for elliptic problems with stochastic coefficients". Computer Methods in Applied Mechanics and Engineering. 194 (2–5): 205–228. Bibcode:2005CMAME.194..205F. doi:10.1016/j.cma.2004.04.008.
- Schwab, Christoph; Todor, Radu Alexandru (2006). "Karhunen–Loève approximation of random fields by generalized fast multipole methods". Journal of Computational Physics. 217 (1): 100–122. Bibcode:2006JCoPh.217..100S. doi:10.1016/j.jcp.2006.01.048.
- Todor, Radu Alexandru; Schwab, Christoph (2007). "Convergence rates for sparse chaos approximations of elliptic problems with stochastic coefficients" (PDF). IMA Journal of Numerical Analysis. 27 (2): 232–261. doi:10.1093/imanum/drl025.
- Schwab, Christoph; Stevenson, Rob (2008). "Adaptive wavelet algorithms for elliptic PDE's on product domains". Mathematics of Computation. 77 (261): 71–92. Bibcode:2008MaCom..77...71S. doi:10.1090/S0025-5718-07-02019-4. ISSN 0025-5718.
- Cohen, Albert; DeVore, Ronald; Schwab, Christoph (2010). "Convergence Rates of Best N-term Galerkin Approximations for a Class of Elliptic sPDEs". Foundations of Computational Mathematics. 10 (6): 615–646. doi:10.1007/s10208-010-9072-2. hdl:20.500.11850/210602. S2CID 3215578.
- Sauter, Stefan A.; Schwab, Christoph (2010). Boundary Element Methods. Springer Series in Computational Mathematics. Vol. 39. pp. 183–287. doi:10.1007/978-3-540-68093-2_4. ISBN 978-3-540-68092-5.
- Barth, Andrea; Schwab, Christoph; Zollinger, Nathaniel (2011). "Multi-level Monte Carlo Finite Element method for elliptic PDEs with stochastic coefficients" (PDF). Numerische Mathematik. 119: 123–161. doi:10.1007/s00211-011-0377-0. hdl:20.500.11850/162459. S2CID 15998016.
- Cohen, Albert; Devore, Ronald; Schwab, Christoph (2011). "Analytic Regularity and Polynomial Approximation of Parametric and Stochastic Elliptic Pde's". Analysis and Applications. 09: 11–47. doi:10.1142/S0219530511001728. hdl:20.500.11850/155035.

=== Books ===
- Schwab, Christoph (1998). P - and hp - finite element methods : theory and applications in solid and fluid mechanics. Oxford University Press. pp. xii+374. ISBN 978-0-19-850390-3. LCCN 98023129; illustrated; 24 cm.
- Sauter, Stefan A.; Schwab, Christoph (November 2010). Boundary Element Methods. Springer. ISBN 978-3-540-68093-2.
- Hilber, Norbert; Reichmann, Oleg; Schwab, Christoph; Winter, Christoph (15 February 2013). Computational Methods for Quantitative Finance: Finite Element Methods for Derivative Pricing. Springer. ISBN 978-3-642-35401-4.
