= Gaussian grid =

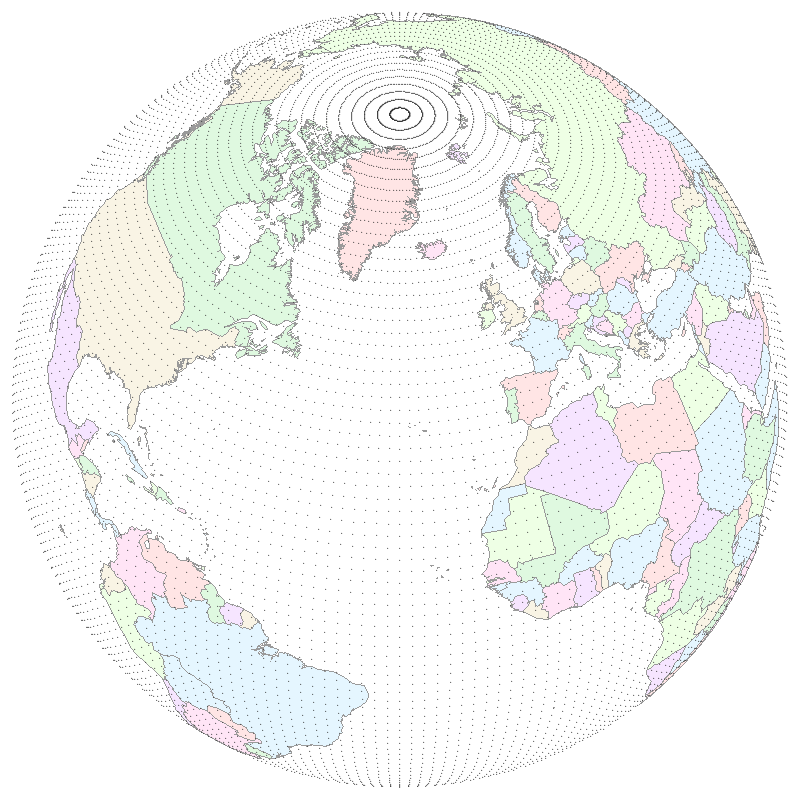
NCEP T62 Gaussian grid points

A Gaussian grid is used in the earth sciences as a gridded horizontal coordinate system for scientific modeling on a sphere (i.e., the approximate shape of the Earth). The grid is rectangular, with a set number of orthogonal coordinates (usually latitude and longitude).

At a given latitude (or parallel), the gridpoints are equally spaced. On the contrary along a longitude (or meridian) the gridpoints are unequally spaced. The spacing between grid points is defined by Gaussian quadrature. By contrast, in the "normal" geographic latitude-longitude grid, gridpoints are equally spaced along both latitudes and longitudes. Gaussian grids also have no grid points at the poles.

In a regular Gaussian grid, the number of gridpoints along the longitudes is constant, usually double the number along the latitudes. In a reduced (or thinned) Gaussian grid, the number of gridpoints in the rows decreases towards the poles, which keeps the gridpoint separation approximately constant across the sphere.

== Examples of Gaussian grids ==
- CCCma global climate models of climate change
  - [96×48]
  - [128×64]
- European Centre for Medium-Range Weather Forecasts
  - 192×96
  - 320×160
  - 512×256
  - 640×320
  - 800×400
  - 1024×512
  - 1600×800
  - 2048×1024
  - 2560×1280
- Features for ERA-40 grids

== See also ==
- Global climate model
- Spectral method
- Spherical harmonics
