= P-FEM =

Numerical method for solving partial differential equations

p-FEM or the p-version of the finite element method is a numerical method for solving partial differential equations. It is a discretization strategy in which the finite element mesh is fixed and the polynomial degrees of elements are increased such that the lowest polynomial degree, denoted by $p_{\min}$, approaches infinity. This is in contrast with the "h-version" or "h-FEM", a widely used discretization strategy, in which the polynomial degrees of elements are fixed and the mesh is refined such that the diameter of the largest element, denoted by $h_{\max}$ approaches zero.

It was demonstrated on the basis of a linear elastic fracture mechanics problem that sequences of finite element solutions based on the p-version converge faster than sequences based on the h-version by Szabó and Mehta in 1978. The theoretical foundations of the p-version were established in a paper published Babuška, Szabó and Katz in 1981 where it was shown that for a large class of problems the asymptotic rate of convergence of the p-version in energy norm is at least twice that of the h-version, assuming that quasi-uniform meshes are used. Additional computational results and evidence of faster convergence of the p-version were presented by Babuška and Szabó in 1982.

The distinction between the h- and p-versions exists primarily for historical and theoretical reasons. In practical applications the design of the mesh and the choice polynomial degrees are both important. In fact, it is possible to realize exponential rates of convergence when the p-version is used in combination with proper mesh design. This point was discussed from the engineering perspective by Szabó and from the theoretical perspective by Guo and Babuška in 1986. Realization of exponential rates of convergence for Maxwell equations was discussed by Costabel, Dauge and Schwab in 2005
