= Newton–Krylov method =

Numerical method for non-linear problems

Newton–Krylov methods are numerical methods for solving non-linear problems using Krylov subspace linear solvers.

Generalising the Newton method to systems of multiple variables, the iteration formula includes a Jacobian matrix. Solving this directly would involve calculation of the Jacobian's inverse, when the Jacobian matrix itself is often difficult or impossible to calculate.

It may be possible to solve the Newton iteration formula without the inverse using a Krylov subspace method, such as the Generalized minimal residual method (GMRES). (Depending on the system, a preconditioner might be required.) The result is a Newton–Krylov method.

The Jacobian itself might be too difficult to compute, but the GMRES method does not require the Jacobian itself, only the result of multiplying given vectors by the Jacobian. Often this can be computed efficiently via difference formulae. Solving the Newton iteration formula in this manner, the result is a Jacobian-Free Newton-Krylov (JFNK) method.
