= Georgy Petrov =

Soviet physicist (1912–1987)

Georgy Ivanovich Petrov (Russian: Георгий Иванович Петров; 31 May 1912, Pinega – 13 May 1987, Moscow) was a Soviet physicist specializing in fluid mechanics and gas dynamics. In 1935 after graduating from the Moscow State University, Petrov worked at the Central Aerohydrodynamic Institute. In 1944 he worked at NII-1, a jet propulsion research institute. In 1953 he was nominated professor at the Moscow State University. In the same year he became a member of the Academy of Sciences of the Soviet Union. From 1965 to 1973 Petrov directed the Russian Space Research Institute.

== See also ==
- Petrov–Galerkin method
