= FPM =

FPM may refer to:

== Companies and organisations ==
- Fédération patronale monégasque, a Monegasque employers organization
- Fondazzjoni Patrimonju Malti (English: Maltese Patrimony Foundation), a non-profit heritage foundation in Malta
- Friesland Porzellan-Manufaktur, a German porcelain manufacturer since 1958

=== Politics ===
- Free Patriotic Movement, a Lebanese political party
- FrontPage Magazine, an American political website
- Morazanist Patriotic Front (Spanish: Frente Patriótico Morazanista), a Honduran guerrilla group
- Popular Front of Moldova (Romanian: Frontul Popular din Moldova), a defunct Moldovan political movement
- Force for Mexico (Spanish: Fuerza por México), a defunct Mexican political party

=== Education ===
- Faculté polytechnique de Mons, a Belgian engineering school
- Faculty of Pharmaceutical Medicine
- Fellowship of Postgraduate Medicine
- Fellow Programme in Management

== Music ==
- Fantastic Plastic Machine (disambiguation)
- First Priority Music, an American record label

== Science and technology ==
- Feet per minute, used in machining
- Finite point method, for solving partial differential equations
- Finite pointset method, in continuum mechanics
- First-pass metabolism, that is, the first pass effect, a phenomenon of metabolism that affects drug bioavailability
- Flashes per minute, for lighting accessories
- Fluorinated propylene monomer, a fluorocarbon elastomer

=== Computing ===
- PHP-FPM (FastCGI Process Manager), a FastCGI implementation for PHP
- Fast page mode DRAM, a type of computer memory
- Fortran Package Manager, a package manager and build system, supported by Sovereign Tech Fund
