= Paulett Liewer =

American plasma physicist

Paulett Creyke Liewer (born 1945) is an American plasma physicist whose research has spanned scales from particle-in-cell simulation and microturbulence in tokamaks to the observation of solar flares and the boundary of the heliosphere. She is a principal scientist at the Jet Propulsion Laboratory.

== Education and career ==
Liewer was born on June 27, 1945, in Washington, D.C. The daughter of a screenwriter, she became determined to become a physicist in high school. She graduated from Cornell University in 1967, and completed her Ph.D. at the University of Maryland, College Park in 1972.

She worked as a researcher for the Naval Research Laboratory from 1973 to 1975, at the University of Maryland from 1975 to 1978, at the University of California, Los Angeles from 1979 to 1981, and at the California Institute of Technology from 1980 to 1986, before joining the Jet Propulsion Laboratory, where she became a principal scientist in 1999.

== Recognition ==
Liewer was named a Fellow of the American Physical Society (APS) in 1992, after a nomination from the APS Division of Computational Physics, "for her pioneering work in use of parallel supercomputers for plasma modeling, both development of concurrent algorithms for plasma particle-in-cell codes and application to physical problems, and also past work on transport in tokamaks."
