= Generalized-strain mesh-free formulation =

The generalized-strain mesh-free (GSMF) formulation is a local meshfree method in the field of numerical analysis, completely integration free, working as a weighted-residual weak-form collocation. This method was first presented by Oliveira and Portela (2016), in order to further improve the computational efficiency of meshfree methods in numerical analysis. Local meshfree methods are derived through a weighted-residual formulation which leads to a local weak form that is the well known work theorem of the theory of structures. In an arbitrary local region, the work theorem establishes an energy relationship between a statically-admissible stress field and an independent kinematically-admissible strain field. Based on the independence of these two fields, this formulation results in a local form of the work theorem that is reduced to regular boundary terms only, integration-free and free of volumetric locking.

Advantages over finite element methods are that GSMF doesn't rely on a grid, and is more precise and faster when solving bi-dimensional problems. When compared to other meshless methods, such as rigid-body displacement mesh-free (RBDMF) formulation, the element-free Galerkin (EFG) and the meshless local Petrov-Galerkin finite volume method (MLPG FVM); GSMF proved to be superior not only regarding the computational efficiency, but also regarding the accuracy.

The moving least squares (MLS) approximation of the elastic field is used on this local meshless formulation.

== Formulation ==
In the local form of the work theorem, equation:

$$\int_{\Gamma_Q} \mathbf{t}^T \mathbf{u}^{*} d\Gamma + \int_{\Omega_Q} \mathbf{b}^{T} \mathbf{u}^{*} d\Omega = \int_{\Omega_Q} \boldsymbol{\sigma}^T \boldsymbol{\varepsilon}^{*} d\Omega.$$

The displacement field $\mathbf{u}^{*}$, was assumed as a continuous function leading to a regular integrable function that is the kinematically-admissible strain field $\boldsymbol{\varepsilon}^{*}$. However, this continuity assumption on $\mathbf{u}^{*}$, enforced in the local form of the work theorem, is not absolutely required but can be relaxed by convenience, provided $\boldsymbol{\varepsilon}^{*}$ can be useful as a generalized function, in the sense of the theory of distributions, see Gelfand and Shilov. Hence, this formulation considers that the displacement field $\mathbf{u}^{*}$, is a piecewise continuous function, defined in terms of the Heaviside step function and therefore the corresponding strain field $\boldsymbol{\varepsilon}^{*}$, is a generalized function defined in terms of the Dirac delta function.

For the sake of the simplicity, in dealing with Heaviside and Dirac delta functions in a two-dimensional coordinate space, consider a scalar function $d$, defined as:

$$d = \lVert\ \mathbf{x}-\mathbf{x}_Q \rVert$$

which represents the absolute-value function of the distance between a field point $\mathbf{x}$ and a particular reference point $\mathbf{x}_Q$, in the local domain $\Omega_Q \cup \Gamma_Q$ assigned to the field node $Q$. Therefore, this definition always assumes $d=d(\mathbf{x},\mathbf{x}_Q) \geq 0$, as a positive or null value, in this case whenever $\mathbf{x}$ and $\mathbf{x}_Q$ are coincident points.

For a scalar coordinate $d\supset d(\mathbf{x},\mathbf{x}_Q)$, the Heaviside step function can be defined as

$$H(d) = 1 \,\,\,\,\,\, if \,\,\,\,\, d\leq 0 \,\,\,\,\,\, (d=0 \,\,\, for \,\,\, \mathbf{x} \equiv \mathbf{x}_Q)$$
$$H(d) = 0 \,\,\,\,\,\, if \,\,\,\,\, d > 0 \,\,\,\,\,\, (\mathbf{x} \neq \mathbf{x}_Q)$$

in which the discontinuity is assumed at $\mathbf{x}_Q$ and consequently, the Dirac delta function is defined with the following properties

$$\delta(d) = H'(d) = \infty \,\,\,\,\,\, if \,\,\,\,\, d=0 \,\,\, that \,\, is \,\,\, \mathbf{x} \equiv \mathbf{x}_Q$$
$$\delta(d) = H'(d) = 0 \,\,\,\,\,\, if \,\,\,\,\, d\neq 0 \,\,\, (d>0 \,\,\, for \,\,\, \mathbf{x} \neq \mathbf{x}_Q)$$

and

$$\int\limits_{-\infty}^{+\infty} \delta(d)\,d d=1$$

in which $H'(d)$ represents the distributional derivative of $H(d)$. Note that the derivative of $H(d)$, with respect to the coordinate $x_i$, can be defined as

$$H(d)_{,i}=H'(d) \,\, d_{,i}= \delta(d) \,\, d_{,i}=\delta(d) \,\, n_i$$

Since the result of this equation is not affected by any particular value of the constant $n_i$, this constant will be conveniently redefined later on.

Consider that $d_l$, $d_j$ and $d_k$ represent the distance function $d$, for corresponding collocation points $\mathbf{x}_l$, $\mathbf{x}_j$ and $\mathbf{x}_k$. The displacement field $\mathbf{u}^{*}(\mathbf{x})$, can be conveniently defined as

$$\mathbf{u}^{*}(\mathbf{x}) = \Bigg[\frac{L_{i}}{n_i}\,\sum_{l=1}^{n_i} H(d_l)+\frac{L_{t}}{n_t}\,\sum_{j=1}^{n_t} H(d_j) +\frac{S}{n_\Omega}\,\sum_{k=1}^{n_\Omega} H(d_k)\Bigg] \mathbf{e}$$

in which $\mathbf{e}=[1\,\,\,\, 1]^T$ represents the metric of the orthogonal directions and $n_i$, $n_t$ and $n_\Omega$ represent the number of collocation points, respectively on the local interior boundary $\Gamma_{Qi}=\Gamma_Q-\Gamma_{Qt}-\Gamma_{Qu}$ with length $L_i$, on the local static boundary $\Gamma_{Qt}$ with length $L_t$ and in the local domain $\Omega_Q$ with area $S$. This assumed displacement field $\mathbf{u}^{*}(\mathbf{x})$, a discrete rigid-body unit displacement defined at collocation points. The strain field $\boldsymbol{\varepsilon}^{*}(\mathbf{x})$, is given by

$$\boldsymbol{\varepsilon}^{*}(\mathbf{x})=\mathbf{L}\,\mathbf{u}^{*}(\mathbf{x})= \Bigg[\frac{L_{i}}{n_i}\,\sum_{l=1}^{n_i} \mathbf{L}\,H(d_l)+\frac{L_{t}}{n_t}\,\sum_{j=1}^{n_t} \mathbf{L}\,H(d_j) +\frac{S}{n_\Omega}\,\sum_{k=1}^{n_\Omega} \mathbf{L}\,H(d_k)\Bigg] \mathbf{e}
=\Bigg[\frac{L_{i}}{n_i}\,\sum_{l=1}^{n_i}\,\delta(d_l)\,\mathbf{n}^{T}\,+\frac{L_{t}}{n_t}\,\sum_{j=1}^{n_t} \,\delta(d_j)\,\mathbf{n}^{T}\, +\frac{S}{n_\Omega}\,\sum_{k=1}^{n_\Omega} \,\delta(d_k)\,\mathbf{n}^{T}\Bigg] \mathbf{e}$$

Having defined the displacement and the strain components of the kinematically-admissible field, the local work theorem can be written as

$$\frac{L_{i}}{n_i}\sum_{l=1}^{n_i}\,\int\limits_{\Gamma_Q-\Gamma_{Qt}}\!\!\!\!\!\!\mathbf{t}^{T} H(d_l)\mathbf{e}\,d\Gamma +
\frac{L_{t}}{n_t}\sum_{j=1}^{n_t}\,\int\limits_{\Gamma_{Qt}}\!\overline{\mathbf{t}}^{T} H(d_j)\mathbf{e}\,d\Gamma +
\frac{S}{n_\Omega}\sum_{k=1}^{n_\Omega}\,\int\limits_{\Omega_Q}\mathbf{b}^{T} H(d_k)\mathbf{e}\,d\Omega
=\frac{S}{n_\Omega}\sum_{k=1}^{n_\Omega}\,\int\limits_{\Omega_Q}\boldsymbol{\sigma}^{T}\delta(d_k)\,\mathbf{n}^{T}\mathbf{e}\,d\Omega.$$

Taking into account the properties of the Heaviside step function and Dirac delta function, this equation simply leads to

$$\frac{L_{i}}{n_i}\sum_{l=1}^{n_i}\,\mathbf{t}_{\mathbf{x}_l} = -\,\frac{L_{t}}{n_t}\sum_{j=1}^{n_t}\,\overline{\mathbf{t}}_{\mathbf{x}_j} -\,\frac{S}{n_\Omega}\sum_{k=1}^{n_\Omega}\,\mathbf{b}_{\mathbf{x}_k}$$

Discretization of this equations can be carried out with the MLS approximation, for the local domain $\Omega_Q$, in terms of the nodal unknowns $\hat{\mathbf{u}}$, thus leading to the system of linear algebraic equations that can be written as

$$\frac{L_{i}}{n_i}\sum_{l=1}^{n_i}\,\mathbf{n}_{\mathbf{x}_l}\mathbf{D}\mathbf{B}_{\mathbf{x}_l}\hat{\mathbf{u}} =-\,\frac{L_{t}}{n_t}\sum_{j=1}^{n_t}\,\overline{\mathbf{t}}_{\mathbf{x}_j}-\,\frac{S}{n_\Omega}\sum_{k=1}^{n_\Omega}\,\mathbf{b}_{\mathbf{x}_k}$$

or simply

$$\mathbf{K}_Q\,\hat{\mathbf{u}}=\mathbf{F}_Q$$

This formulation states the equilibrium of tractions and body forces, pointwisely defined at collocation points, obviously, it is the pointwise version of the Euler-Cauchy stress principle. This is the equation used in the Generalized-Strain Mesh-Free (GSMF) formulation which, therefore, is free of integration. Since the work theorem is a weighted-residual weak form, it can be easily seen that this integration-free formulation is nothing else other than a weighted-residual weak-form collocation. The weighted-residual weak-form collocation readily overcomes the well-known difficulties posed by the weighted-residual strong-form collocation, regarding accuracy and stability of the solution.

== See also ==
- Moving least squares
- Finite element method
- Boundary element method
- Meshfree methods
- Numerical analysis
- Computational Solid Mechanics
