= Discrete least squares meshless method =

In mathematics the discrete least squares meshless (DLSM) method is a meshless method based on the least squares concept. The method is based on the minimization of a least squares functional, defined as the weighted summation of the squared residual of the governing differential equation and its boundary conditions at nodal points used to discretize the domain and its boundaries.

== Description ==
While most of the existing meshless methods need background cells for numerical integration, DLSM did not require a numerical integration procedure due to the use of the discrete least squares method to discretize the governing differential equation. A Moving least squares (MLS) approximation method is used to construct the shape function, making the approach a fully least squares-based approach.

Arzani and Afshar developed the DLSM method in 2006 for the solution of Poisson's equation. Firoozjaee and Afshar proposed the collocated discrete least squares meshless (CDLSM) method to solve elliptic partial differential equations, and studied the effect of the collocation points on the convergence and accuracy of the method. The method can be considered as an extension the earlier method of DLSM by the introduction of a set of collocation points for the calculation of the least squares functional.

CDLSM was later used by Naisipour et al. to solve elasticity problems regarding the irregular distribution of nodal points. Afshar and Lashckarbolok used the CDLSM method for the adaptive simulation of hyperbolic problems. A simple a posteriori error indicator based on the value of the least squares functional and a node moving strategy was used and tested on 1-D hyperbolic problems. Shobeyri and Afshar simulated free surface problems using the DLSM method.

The method was then extended for adaptive simulation of two-dimensional shocked hyperbolic problems by Afshar and Firoozjaee. Also, adaptive node-moving refinement and multi-stage node enrichment adaptive refinement are formulated in the DLSM for the solution of elasticity problems.

Amani, Afshar and Naisipour. proposed mixed discrete least squares meshless (MDLSM) formulation for solution of planar elasticity problems. In this approach, the differential equations governing the planar elasticity problems are written in terms of the stresses and displacements which are approximated independently using the same shape functions. Since the resulting governing equations are of the first order, both the displacement and stress boundary conditions are of the Dirichlet type, which is easily incorporated via a penalty method. Because this is a least squares based algorithm of the MDLSM method, the proposed method does not need to be satisfied by the Ladyzhenskaya–Babuška–Brezzi (LBB) condition.
