= Momentum mapping format =

Technique in the Material Point Method (MPM)

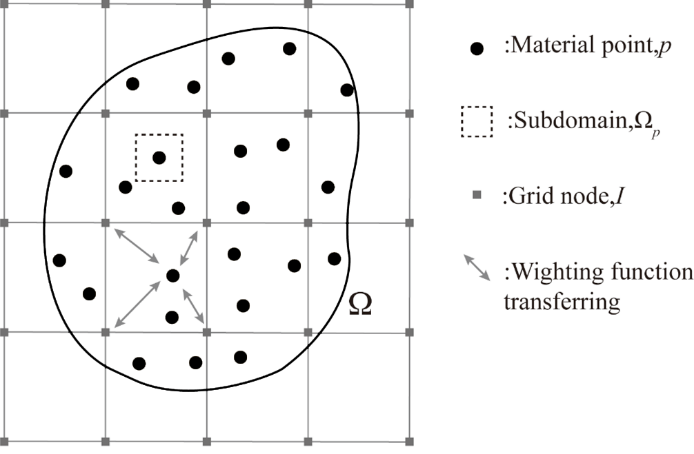
Material point method discrete format

Momentum mapping format is a key technique in the material point method (MPM) for transferring physical quantities such as momentum, mass, and stress between a material point and a background grid.

The material point method is a numerical technique using a mixed Eulerian-Lagrangian description. It discretizes the computational domain with material points and employs a background grid to solve the momentum equations. Proposed by Sulsky et al. in 1994.

MPM has since been expanded to various fields such as computational solid dynamics. Currently, MPM features several momentum mapping schemes, with the four main ones being PIC (particle-in-cell), FLIP (fluid-implicit particle), hybrid format, and APIC (affine particle-in-cell). Understanding these schemes in-depth is crucial for the further development of MPM.

== Background ==
MPM represents materials as collections of material points (or particles). Unlike other particle methods such as SPH (smoothed-particle hydrodynamics) and DEM (discrete element method), MPM also uses a background grid to solve the momentum equations arising from particle interactions. MPM can be categorized as a mixed particle/grid method or a mixed Lagrangian-Eulerian method. By combining the strengths of both frameworks, MPM aims to be the most effective numerical solver for large deformation problems. It has been further developed and applied to various challenging problems such as high-speed impact (Huang et al., 2011), landslides (Fern et al., 2019), saturated porous media (He et al., 2024), and fluid-structure interaction (Li et al., 2022).

The material point method community has developed several momentum mapping schemes, among which PIC, FLIP, the hybrid scheme, and APIC are the most common. The FLIP scheme is widely used for dynamic problems due to its energy conservation properties, although it can introduce numerical noise and instability (Bardenhagen, 2002), potentially leading to computational failure. Conversely, the PIC scheme is known for numerical stability and is advantageous for static problems, but it suffers from significant numerical dissipation (Brackbill et al., 1988), which is unacceptable for strongly dynamic responses. Nairn et al. combined FLIP and PIC linearly (Nairn, 2015) to create a hybrid scheme, adjusting the proportion of each component based on empirical rather than theoretical analysis. Hammerquist and Nairn (2017) introduced an improved scheme called XPIC-m (for eXtended particle-in-cell of order m), which addresses the excessive filtering and numerical diffusion of PIC while suppressing the noise caused by the nonlinear space in FLIP used in MPM. XPIC-1 (eXtended particle-in-cell of order 1) is equivalent to the standard PIC method. Jiang et al. (2017, 2015) introduced the affine particle in cell (APIC) method, where particle velocities are represented locally affine, preserving linear and angular momentum during the transfer process. This significantly reduces numerical dissipation and avoids the velocity noise and instability seen in FLIP. Fu et al. (2017) introduced generalized local functions into the APIC method, proposing the polynomial particle in cell (PolyPIC) method. PolyPIC views G2P (Grid-to-Particle) transfer as a projection of the particle's local grid velocity, preserving linear and angular momentum, thereby improving energy and vorticity retention compared to the original APIC. Additionally, PolyPIC retains the filtering properties of APIC and PIC, providing robustness against noise.

== Affine particle in cell method ==
In the PIC scheme, particle velocities during the grid-to-particle (G2P) substep are directly overwritten by extrapolating the nodal velocities to the particles themselves:

$\mathbf{V}_{p}^{n+1} =\sum_{I}^{} S_{Ip}^{n} \mathbf{V}_{I}^{n+1}$

In the FLIP scheme, the material point velocities are updated by interpolating the velocity increments of the grid nodes over the current time step:

$\mathbf{a}_{I}^{n} =\frac{f_{I}^{int,n}+f_{I}^{ext,n} }{m_{I}^{n}}$

$\mathbf{V}_{p}^{n+1} =\mathbf{V}_{p}^{n}+ \sum_{I}^{} S_{Ip}^{n} \mathbf{a}_{I}^{n} \Delta t$

The hybrid scheme's momentum mapping can be mathematically represented as:

$\mathbf{V}_{p}^{n+1} =(1-\alpha _{FLIP}^{} ) \mathbf{V}_{p}^{PIC,n+1} + \alpha_{FLIP}^{} ) \mathbf{V}_{p}^{FLIP,n+1}$

where the parameters are defined as shown here below

- $\mathbf{V}_{p}^{FLIP,n+1}$ represents the velocity computed using the FLIP scheme
- $\mathbf{V}_{p}^{PIC,n+1}$ represents the velocity using the PIC scheme
- $\alpha _{FLIP}^{}$ is the proportion of FLIP with $\alpha _{FLIP}^{} =1$ representing pure FLIP and $\alpha _{FLIP}^{} =0$ representing pure PIC

Based on the idea of "providing the local velocity field around the material point to the background grid by transferring the material point's velocity gradient," Jiang et al. (2015) proposed the APIC method. In this method, the particle velocity is locally affine, mathematically expressed as:

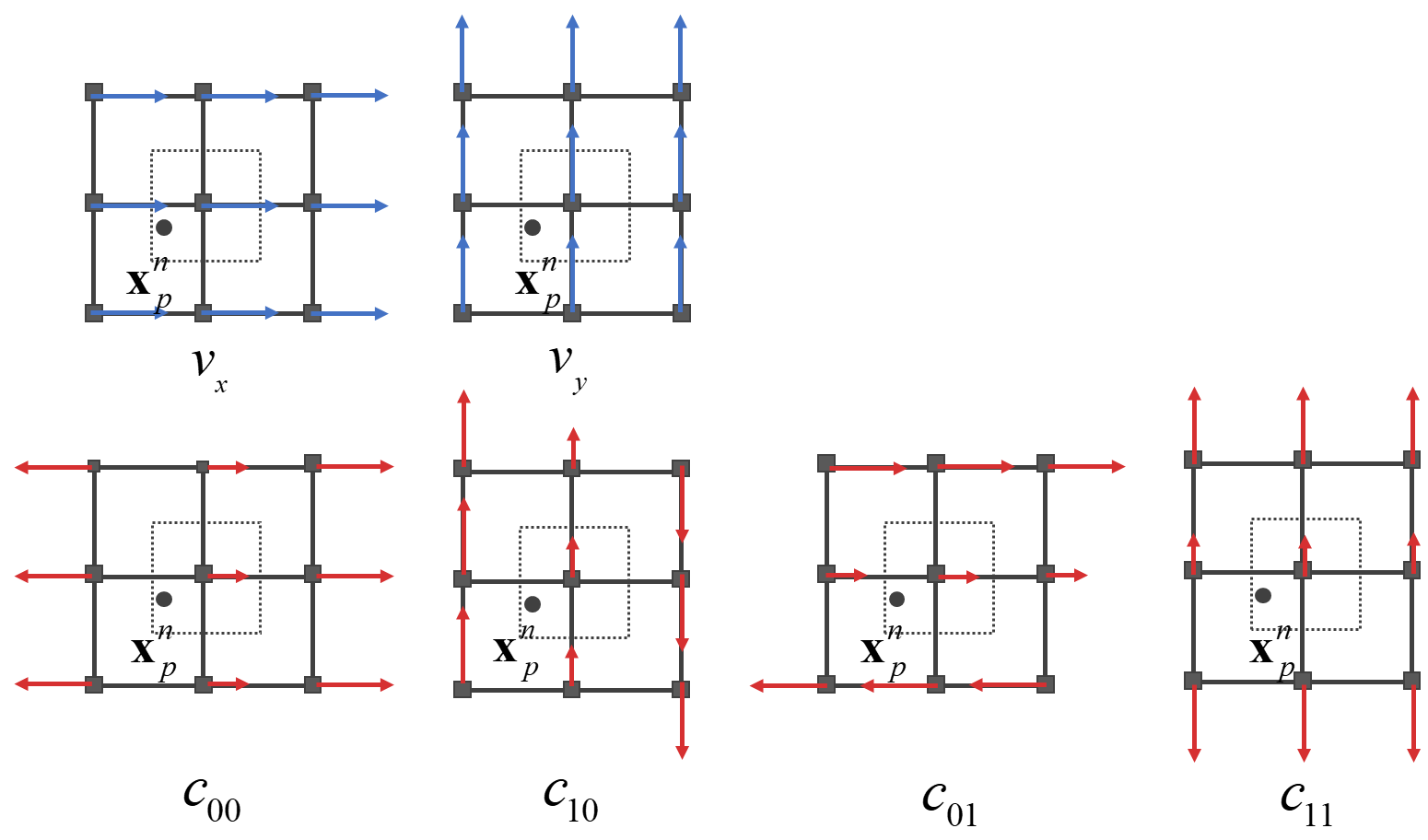
Illustration of the affine velocity field of material point p (the arrows represent the projected velocity at the node)

$\mathbf{V}_{p}^{affine} = \mathbf{V}_{p}^{} + \mathbf{C}_{p}(\mathbf{x}_{}^{} - \mathbf{x}_{p}^{})$

where the parameters are defined as shown here below:

- $\mathbf{V}_{p}$ indicates the translational speed
- $$\mathbf{C}_{p}^{} =\begin{bmatrix}
C_{00}^{}, C_{01}^{} \\
C_{10}^{}, C_{11}^{} \\\end{bmatrix}$$
  represents the emission matrix， $C_{00}^{}$ and $C_{01}^{}$ represent the pattern of horizontal and vertical stretching models, respectively, while $C_{00}^{}$ and $C_{01}^{}$ represent the pattern of clockwise and counterclockwise shear motion models, respectively. If $\mathbf{C}_{p}^{} =0$, the momentum mapping scheme will be simplified to PIC mode.

== Computational implementation ==
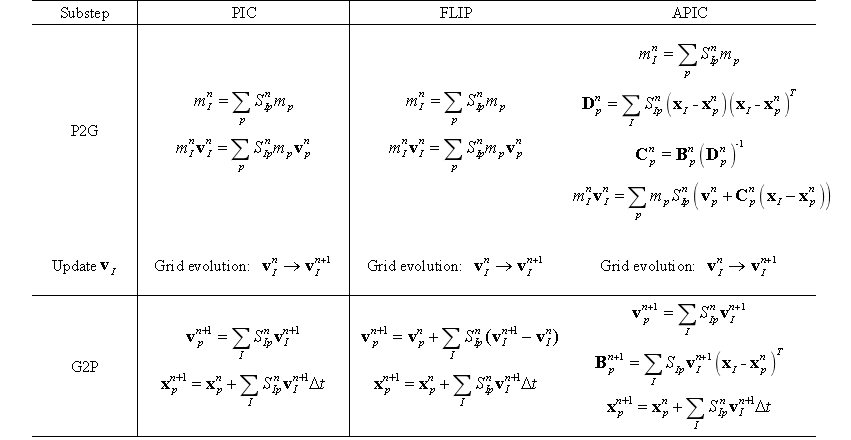
Time integration schemes for PIC, FLIP, and APIC

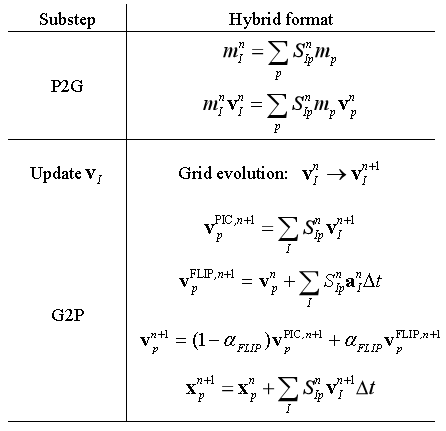
Time integration schemes for the hybrid format

PIC (particle-in-cell), FLIP (Fluid-Implicit Particle), hybrid (hybrid solution) and APIC (affine) The different numerical methods used in particle-in-cell fluid simulation greatly show how they map momentum and time integrals between material points and grids, and how they differ from each other. The typical time integration schemes for PIC, FLIP, hybrid, and APIC schemes have their own unique characteristics. The evolution of momentum on the grid under each scheme is identical. Despite the differences among these four-momentum mapping formats, their common points are still dominant. In the P2G process, the momentum mapping in PIC, FLIP, and hybrid schemes is the same. The material point positions are updated in the same manner across all four schemes. During the G2P stage, PIC transfers the updated momentum on grid nodes directly back to the material points, FLIP uses incremental mapping, and the hybrid scheme linearly combines FLIP and PIC using a coefficient. APIC mapping maintains an additional affine matrix on top of the PIC mapping.

== Numerical tests ==
Numerical tests on ring collision highlight the performance of different momentum mapping schemes in dynamic problems. The mean stress distribution and total energy evolution curve at typical time are the key contents of researchers' attention. Due to the PIC mapping scheme canceling out velocities in opposite directions, significant energy loss occurs, preventing effective conversion of kinetic energy into strain energy. GIMP_FLIP (generalized interpolation material point - fluid implicit particle) shows notable numerical noise and instability, with severe oscillations in mean stress, leading to numerical fracture. GIMP_FLPI0.99 exhibits improved stability but still carries the risk of numerical fracture. Tests indicate that increasing the PIC component enhances numerical stability, with stress distribution becoming more uniform and regular, and the probability of numerical fracture decreasing. However, energy loss also becomes more pronounced. GIMP_APIC (generalized interpolation material point - affine particle-in-cell) demonstrates the best performance, providing a stable and smooth stress distribution while maintaining excellent energy conservation characteristics.

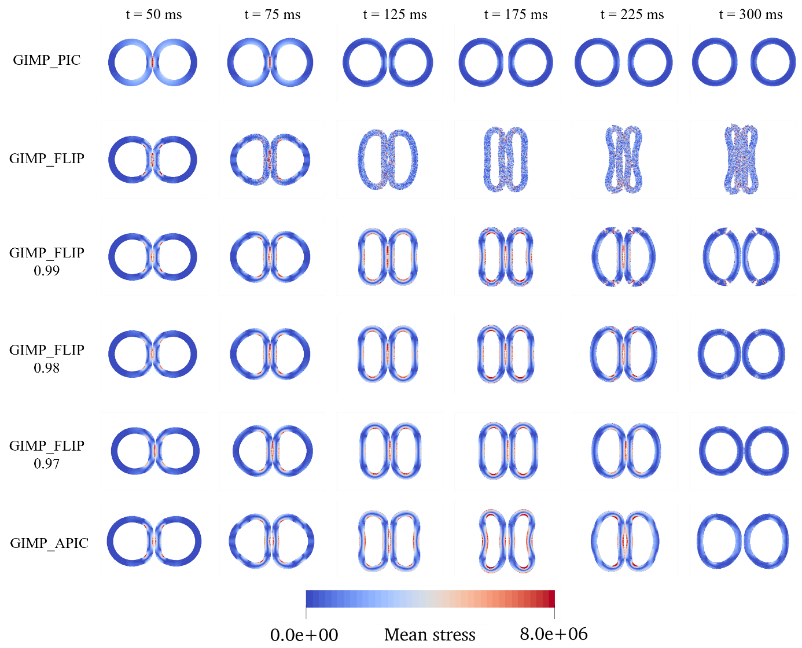
Stress profile snapshots utilizing various mapping schemes

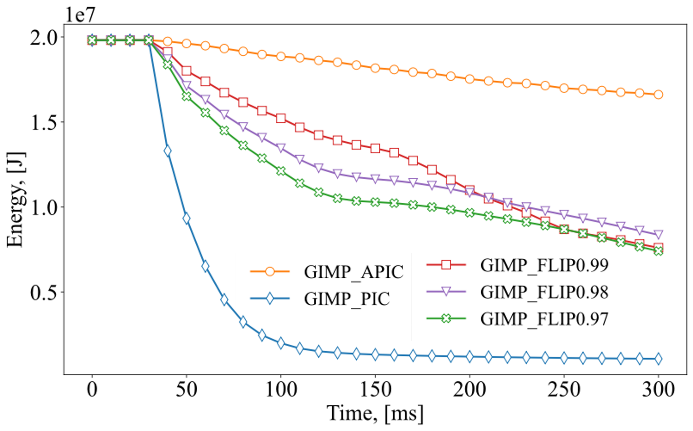
The evolution of total energy using different mapping format

== Related research and developments ==
Recently, Qu et al. proposed PowerPIC (Qu et al., 2022), a more stable and accurate mapping scheme based on optimization, which also maintains volume and uniform particle distribution characteristics.

== See also ==
- Smoothed Particle Hydrodynamics
- Finite Element Method
- Particle-in-cell
- Material point method
- Numerical Methods for Partial Differential Equations
