= James F. O'Brien =

American computer scientist and professor

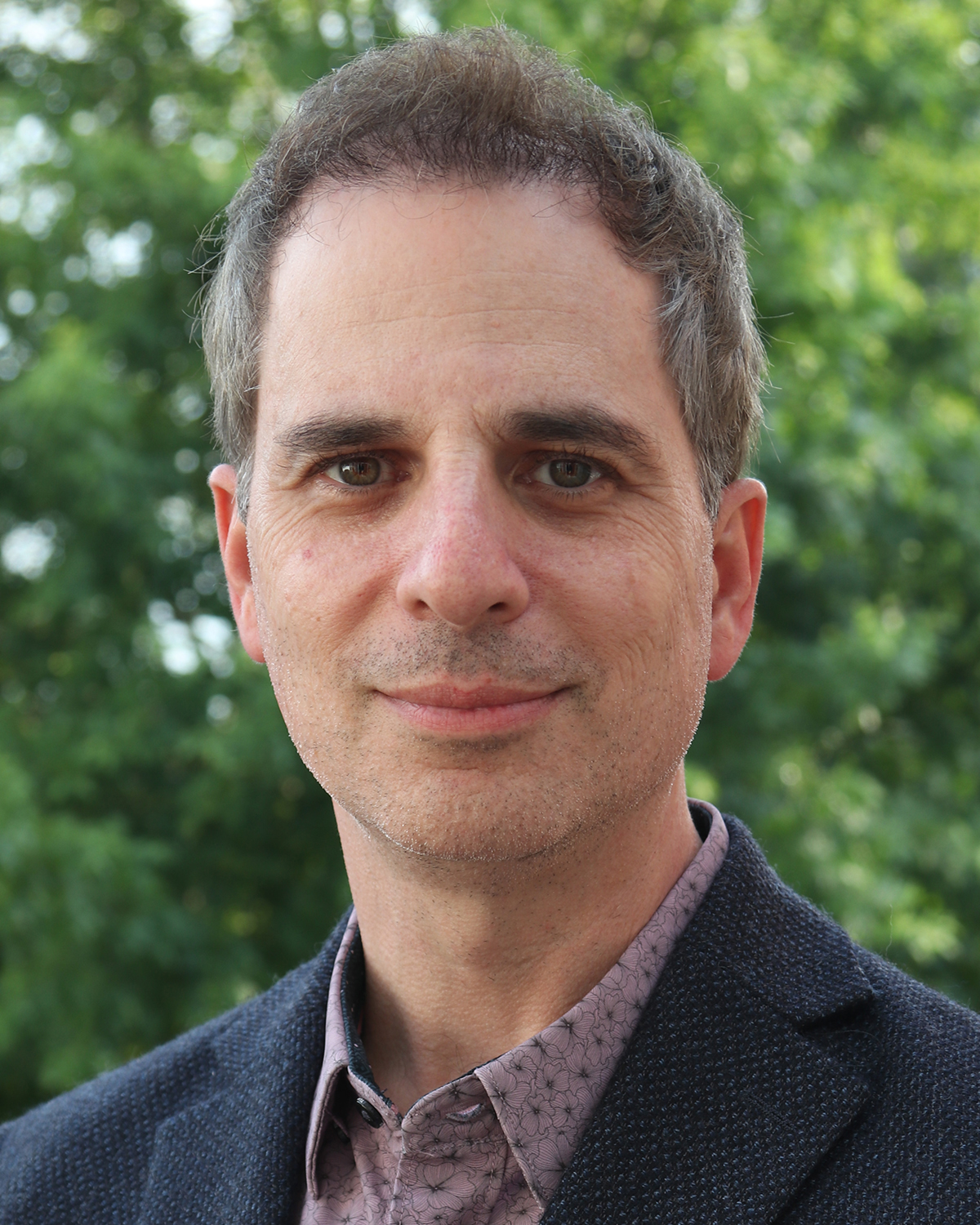
- Born: United States
- Education: Georgia Tech College of Computing (PhD); Florida International University (BS)
- Awards: ACM SIGGRAPH Test of Time Award (2025); Academy Technical Achievement Award (2015); GVU Center Fifteen Year Impact Award (2007); FIU College of Engineering Distinguished Alumni Award (2006); Sloan Research Fellowship (2004); MIT Technology Review TR100 (2004)
- Scientific career
- Fields: Computer graphics, Computer science
- Workplaces: University of California, Berkeley
- Thesis: Graphical Modeling and Animation of Brittle Fracture (1999)
- Doctoral advisor: Jessica Hodgins
- Doctoral students: Adam W. Bargteil, Rahul Narain, Adam Kirk, Tobias Pfaff, Hayley Iben
- Website: O'Brien's personal website

James F. O'Brien is a computer graphics researcher and professor of computer science at the University of California, Berkeley. His research includes computer graphics, physically based animation, machine learning, image forensics, human visual perception, digital privacy and virtual reality.

In 2015, he received a Technical Achievement Award from the Academy of Motion Picture Arts and Sciences for research used to simulate fracture and deformation in visual effects. In 2025, he and coauthors received an ACM SIGGRAPH Test of Time Award for the paper "Fast Simulation of Mass-Spring Systems".

== Education and career ==
James O'Brien received a Bachelor of Science in computer science from Florida International University in 1992, followed by a Master of Science in 1997 and a PhD in 2000, both also in computer science, from the Georgia Institute of Technology. His doctoral adviser was Jessica Hodgins.

He joined UC Berkeley's EECS faculty in 2000. He served as a director-at-large of ACM SIGGRAPH from 2010 to 2016.

In 2012, O'Brien co-founded Avametric, a company developing cloth simulation software for apparel design and virtual try-on, and served as its chief scientific officer. The company was acquired by Gerber Technology in 2018.

== Research and professional activities ==
O'Brien has published research papers on topics such as surface reconstruction, human figure animation, mesh generation, physically based animation, surgical simulation, computational fluid dynamics, and fracture propagation.

O'Brien served as a consultant on the development of the game physics engine Digital Molecular Matter (DMM). To date, this game engine has been used in the 2008 video game Star Wars: The Force Unleashed and an off-line version of it was used for special effects in the film Avatar, Sucker Punch, Source Code, X-Men: First Class, and more than 60 other feature films.

In 2015, his work on developing DMM was recognized by the Academy of Motion Picture Arts and Sciences with a Technical Achievement award. The citation reads:

"To Ben Cole for the design of the Kali Destruction System, to Eric Parker for the development of the Digital Molecular Matter toolkit, and to James O’Brien for his influential research on the finite element methods that served as a foundation for these tools. The combined innovations in Kali and DMM provide artists with an intuitive, art-directable system for the creation of scalable and realistic fracture and deformation simulations. These tools established finite element methods as a new reference point for believable on-screen destruction."

== UC Berkeley ==
He joined UC Berkeley's Computer Science department as a faculty member in 2000. O'Brien runs the Berkeley Computer Animation and Modeling Group and his research focuses primarily on physically based animation, 3D modeling, and audio simulation.

== Photo forensics and fake media detection ==
O'Brien is an expert on detection and analysis of fake images and video. He has frequently worked with news organizations on exposing fake or altered photographs, as well as images created by generative AI software.

His methods have been used to expose fabrication of medical research records, validate evidentiary videos, and rule out conspiracy theories relating to photographs of the Moon landing. In response to their work debunking assertions that the shadows in photos of the 1969 Moon Landing and of Lee Harvey Oswald, coauthor Hany Farid has been accused by conspiracy theorists of being a time-traveling CIA operative.

In addition to developing methods for detecting fake images and video, O'Brien's has studied the impact of fake media on viewers and investigated what factors contribute to a viewer's acceptance or skepticism regarding the media they consume. In a 2023 interview, O'Brien said that due to rapid progress in machine learning it would become "impossible to tell the difference between a generated image and a real one", and that detection software would eventually lose the arms race between detection and generation methods. In news interviews, O'Brien has advocated for changing societal attitudes regarding trusting media and that viewers should suspect everything as potentially fake.

== Awards ==
- SIGGRAPH Impact Award (1999)
- SIGGRAPH Test of Time Award (2025)
- Technology Review TR100 (2004)
- Sloan Fellowship (2004)
- College of Engineering Distinguished Alumni, Florida International University (2006)
- GVU 15 Impact Award
- Jim and Donna Gray Endowment Award for Excellence in Undergraduate Teaching (2008)
- The Academy of Motion Pictures Arts and Sciences Award for Scientific and Technical Achievement (Sci-Tech Oscar, 2015)
- DreamWorks Animation award for Technical Achievement for work in the field of Machine Learning related to Character Rigging (2020)
