= Natural element method =

20 points and their Voronoi cells

The natural element method (NEM) is a meshless method to solve partial differential equation, where the elements do not have a predefined shape as in the finite element method, but depend on the geometry.

A Voronoi diagram partitioning the space is used to create each of these elements.

Natural neighbor interpolation functions are then used to model the unknown function within each element.

== Applications ==
When the simulation is dynamic, this method prevents the elements to be ill-formed, having the possibility to easily redefine them at each time step depending on the geometry.
