= Moving particle semi-implicit method =

The moving particle semi-implicit (MPS) method is a computational method for the simulation of incompressible free surface flows. It is a macroscopic, deterministic particle method (Lagrangian mesh-free method) developed by Koshizuka and Oka (1996).

== Method ==
The MPS method is used to solve the Navier-Stokes equations in a Lagrangian framework. A fractional step method is applied which consists of splitting each time step in two steps of prediction and correction. The fluid is represented with particles, and the motion of each particle is calculated based on the interactions with the neighboring particles by means of a kernel function. The MPS method is similar to the SPH (smoothed-particle hydrodynamics) method (Gingold and Monaghan, 1977; Lucy, 1977) in that both methods provide approximations to the strong form of the partial differential equations (PDEs) on the basis of integral interpolants. However, the MPS method applies simplified differential operator models solely based on a local weighted averaging process without taking the gradient of a kernel function. In addition, the solution process of MPS method differs to that of the original SPH method as the solutions to the PDEs are obtained through a semi-implicit prediction-correction process rather than the fully explicit one in original SPH method.

== Applications ==
Through the past years, the MPS method has been applied in a wide range of engineering applications including Nuclear Engineering (e.g. Koshizuka et al., 1999; Koshizuka and Oka, 2001; Xie et al., 2005), Coastal Engineering (e.g. Gotoh et al., 2005; Gotoh and Sakai, 2006), Environmental Hydraulics (e.g. Shakibaeina and Jin, 2009; Nabian and Farhadi, 2016), Ocean Engineering (Shibata and Koshizuka, 2007; Sueyoshi et al., 2008; Zuo et al. 2022), Structural Engineering (e.g. Chikazawa et al., 2001), Mechanical Engineering (e.g. Heo et al., 2002; Sun et al., 2009), Bioengineering (e.g. Tsubota et al., 2006) and Chemical Engineering (e.g. Sun et al., 2009; Xu and Jin, 2018).

== Improvements ==
Improved versions of MPS method have been proposed for enhancement of numerical stability (e.g. Koshizuka et al., 1998; Zhang et al., 2005; Ataie-Ashtiani and Farhadi, 2006;Shakibaeina and Jin, 2009; Jandaghian and Shakibaeinia, 2020; Cheng et al. 2021), momentum conservation (e.g. Hamiltonian MPS by Suzuki et al., 2007; Corrected MPS by Khayyer and Gotoh, 2008; Enhanced MPS by Jandaghian and Shakibaeinia, 2020), mechanical energy conservation (e.g. Hamiltonian MPS by Suzuki et al., 2007), pressure calculation (e.g. Khayyer and Gotoh, 2009, Kondo and Koshizuka, 2010, Khayyer and Gotoh, 2010, Xu and Jin, 2019), and for simulation of multiphase and granular flows (Nabian and Farhadi 2016; Xu and Jin, 2021; Xu and Li, 2022).
