= Smoothed finite element method =

Class of numerical simulation algorithms

Smoothed finite element methods (S-FEM) are a particular class of numerical simulation algorithms for the simulation of physical phenomena. It was developed by combining meshfree methods with the finite element method. S-FEM are applicable to solid mechanics as well as fluid dynamics problems, although so far they have mainly been applied to the former.

== Description ==
The essential idea in the S-FEM is to use a finite element mesh (in particular triangular mesh) to construct numerical models of good performance. This is achieved by modifying the compatible strain field, or construct a strain field using only the displacements, hoping a Galerkin model using the modified/constructed strain field can deliver some good properties. Such a modification/construction can be performed within elements but more often beyond the elements (meshfree concepts): bring in the information from the neighboring elements. Naturally, the strain field has to satisfy certain conditions, and the standard Galerkin weak form needs to be modified accordingly to ensure the stability and convergence. A comprehensive review of S-FEM covering both methodology and applications can be found in ("Smoothed Finite Element Methods (S-FEM): An Overview and Recent Developments").

== History ==
The development of S-FEM started from the works on meshfree methods, where the so-called weakened weak (W2) formulation based on the G space theory were developed. The W2 formulation offers possibilities for formulate various (uniformly) "soft" models that works well with triangular meshes. Because triangular mesh can be generated automatically, it becomes much easier in re-meshing and hence automation in modeling and simulation. In addition, W2 models can be made soft enough (in uniform fashion) to produce upper bound solutions (for force-driving problems). Together with stiff models (such as the fully compatible FEM models), one can conveniently bound the solution from both sides. This allows easy error estimation for generally complicated problems, as long as a triangular mesh can be generated. Typical W2 models are the Smoothed Point Interpolation Methods (or S-PIM). The S-PIM can be node-based (known as NS-PIM or LC-PIM), edge-based (ES-PIM), and cell-based (CS-PIM). The NS-PIM was developed using the so-called SCNI technique. It was then discovered that NS-PIM is capable of producing upper bound solution and volumetric locking free. The ES-PIM is found superior in accuracy, and CS-PIM behaves in between the NS-PIM and ES-PIM. Moreover, W2 formulations allow the use of polynomial and radial basis functions in the creation of shape functions (it accommodates the discontinuous displacement functions, as long as it is in G1 space), which opens further rooms for future developments.

The S-FEM is largely the linear version of S-PIM, but with most of the properties of the S-PIM and much simpler. It has also variations of NS-FEM, ES-FEM and CS-FEM. The major property of S-PIM can be found also in S-FEM.

== List of S-FEM models ==
- Node-based Smoothed FEM (NS-FEM)
- Edge-based Smoothed FEM (ES-FEM)
- Face-based Smoothed FEM (FS-FEM)
- Cell-based Smoothed FEM (CS-FEM)
- Node/Edge-based Smoothed FEM (NS/ES-FEM)
- Alpha FEM method (Alpha FEM)
- Beta FEM method (Beta FEM)

== Applications ==
S-FEM has been applied to solve the following physical problems:

1. Mechanics for solid structures and piezoelectrics;
2. Fracture mechanics and crack propagation;
3. Nonlinear and contact problems;
4. Stochastic analysis;
5. Heat transfer;
6. Structural acoustics;
7. Adaptive analysis;
8. Limited analysis;
9. Crystal plasticity modeling.

== Basic Formulation of S-FEM ==
The fundamental problem addressed by SFEM is typically the solution of Poisson's equation with Dirichlet boundary conditions, given as follows:

Δu+f=0 in Ω, u=g on ΓD

where Ω is the domain and Γ is its boundary, consisting of ΓD=Γ. Here, u: Ω→R is the trial solution, f: Ω→R is a given function, and g represents Dirichlet boundary conditions.

S-FEM involves discretizing the domain Ω using finite element meshes, which can be global or local. The global mesh represents the entire domain, while the local mesh is used to discretize regions requiring high resolution within the global domain. The local domain is assumed to be included in the global domain (ΩL⊆ΩG).

=== Weak Formulation ===
The weak form of the problem is derived by multiplying the equation by suitable test functions and integrating over the domain. In SFEM, the weak form is expressed as follows: Given f and g, find u∈U such that for all w∈V,

aΩ(w,u)=LΩ(w)

where aΩ is a bilinear form, and LΩ is a linear functional.

=== S-FEM Formulation ===
In S-FEM, the trial solution u and test functions w are defined separately for the global (ΩG) and local (ΩL) domains. The trial solution spaces UG, UL and test function spaces VG, VL are defined accordingly. The weak form in the S-FEM formulation becomes:

aΩ′(w,u)=LΩ′(w)

where aΩ′(⋅,⋅) and LΩ′(⋅) are modified bilinear forms and linear functionals, respectively, to accommodate the S-FEM approach.

=== Challenges ===
One of the primary challenges of S-FEM is the difficulty in exact integration of the submatrices representing the relationship between global and local meshes (KGL and KLG). Additionally, the matrix K can become singular, posing numerical challenges in solving the resulting linear algebraic equations.

These challenges and potential solutions are discussed in detail in the literature, aiming to improve the efficiency and accuracy of S-FEM for various applications.

== B-spline S-FEM (BFSEM) ==
S-FEM can reasonably model an analytical domain by superimposing meshes with different spatial resolutions, it has intrinsic advantages of local high accuracy, low computation time, and simple meshing procedure. However, it has disadvantages such as accuracy of numerical integration and matrix singularity. Although several additional techniques have been proposed to mitigate these limitations, they are computationally expensive or ad-hoc, and detract from the method's strengths. These issues can be address by incorporating cubic B-spline functions with C squared continuity across element boundaries as the global basis function. To avoid matrix singularity, applying different basis functions to different meshes. In a recent study Lagrange basis functions were used as local basis functions. With this method the numerical integration can be calculated with sufficient accuracy without any additional techniques used in conventional S-FEM. Furthermore, the proposed method avoids matrix singularity and is superior to conventional methods in terms of convergence for solving linear equations. Therefore, the proposed method has the potential to reduce computation time while maintaining a comparable accuracy to conventional S-FEM.

== See also ==
- Finite element method
- Meshfree methods
- Weakened weak form
- Loubignac iteration
