= Finite pointset method =

Method for solving problems in continuum mechanics

In applied mathematics, the finite pointset method (FPM) is a general approach for the numerical solution of problems in continuum mechanics, such as the simulation of fluid flows. In this approach the medium is represented by a finite set of points, each endowed with the relevant local properties of the medium such as density, velocity, pressure, and temperature.

The sampling points can move with the medium, as in the Lagrangian approach to fluid dynamics or they may be fixed in space while the medium flows through them, as in the Eulerian approach. A mixed Lagrangian-Eulerian approach may also be used. The Lagrangian approach is also known (especially in the computer graphics field) as particle method.

Finite pointset methods are meshfree methods and therefore are easily adapted to domains with complex and/or time-evolving geometries and moving phase boundaries (such as a liquid splashing into a container, or the blowing of a glass bottle) without the software complexity that would be required to handle those features with topological data structures. They can be useful in non-linear problems involving viscous fluids, heat and mass transfer, linear and non-linear elastic or plastic deformations, etc.

== Description ==
In the simplest implementations, the finite point set is stored as an unstructured list of points in the medium. In the Lagrangian approach the points move with the medium, and points may be added or deleted in order to maintain a prescribed sampling density. The point density is usually prescribed by a smoothing length defined locally. In the Eulerian approach the points are fixed in space, but new points may be added where there is need for increased accuracy. So, in both approaches the nearest neighbors of a point are not fixed, and are determined again at each time step.

== Advantages ==
This method has various advantages over grid-based techniques; for example, it can handle fluid domains, which change naturally, whereas grid based techniques require additional computational effort. The finite points have to completely cover the whole flow domain, i.e. the point cloud has to fulfill certain quality criteria (finite points are not allowed to form “holes” which means finite points have to find sufficiently numerous neighbours; also, finite points are not allowed to cluster; etc.).

The finite point cloud is a geometrical basis, which allows for a numerical formulation making FPM a general finite difference idea applied to continuum mechanics. That especially means, if the point reduced to a regular cubic point grid, then FPM would reduce to a classical finite difference method. The idea of general finite differences also means that FPM is not based on a weak formulation like Galerkin's approach. Rather, FPM is a strong formulation which models differential equations by direct approximation of the occurring differential operators. The method used is a moving least squares idea which was especially developed for FPM.

== History ==
In order to overcome the disadvantages of the classical methods many approaches have been developed to simulate such flows. A classical grid free Lagrangian method is Smoothed Particle Hydrodynamics (SPH), which was originally introduced to solve problems in astrophysics.

It has since been extended to simulate the compressible Euler equations in fluid dynamics and applied to a wide range of problems. The method has also been extended to simulate inviscid incompressible free surface flows.. The implementation of the boundary conditions is the main problem of the SPH method.

Another approach for solving fluid dynamic equations in a grid free framework is the moving least squares or least squares method. With this approach boundary conditions can be implemented in a natural way just by placing the finite points on boundaries and prescribing boundary conditions on them. The robustness of this method is shown by the simulation results in the field of airbag deployment in car industry. Here, the membrane (or boundary) of the airbag changes very rapidly in time and takes a quite complicated shape (Kuhnert et al. 2000).

Tiwari et al. (2003) performed simulations of incompressible flows as the limit of the compressible Navier–Stokes equations with some stiff equation of state. This approach was first used in Monaghan (1992) to simulate incompressible free surface flows by SPH. The incompressible limit is obtained by choosing a very large speed of sound in the equation of state such that the Mach number becomes small. However, the large value of the speed of sound restricts the time step to be very small due to the CFL-condition.

The projection method of Chorin is a widely used approach to solve problems governed by the incompressible Navier–Stokes equation in a grid based structure. In Tiwari et al. (2001), this method has been applied to a grid free framework with the help of the weighted least squares method. The scheme gives accurate results for the incompressible Navier–Stokes equations. The occurring Poisson equation for the pressure field is solved by a grid free method. It has been shown that the Poisson equation can be solved accurately by this approach for any boundary conditions. The Poisson solver can be adapted to the weighted least squares approximation procedure with the condition that the Poisson equation and the boundary condition must be satisfied on each finite point. This is a local iteration procedure.

== Software ==
- Nogrid points
- MESHFREE
