= Fantastic Plastic Machine =

Fantastic Plastic Machine can mean one of four things:

- Fantastic Plastic Machine (musician), the stage name of Japanese musician Tomoyuki Tanaka
  - The Fantastic Plastic Machine (album), the 1997 debut album of the above artist
- The Fantastic Plastic Machine, the 1969 documentary film about surfing
  - The Fantastic Plastic Machine (soundtrack), the soundtrack to the film, composed by Harry Betts
