= Fédération patronale monégasque =

Fédération patronale monégasque ('Monaco Employers Federation', abbreviated FPM) is the national employers organization in Monaco. FPM was founded in 1944. FPM signed the first collective bargaining agreement with the USM trade union centre on November 5, 1945.

As of 2002, FPM had 23 member organizations and some 1,500 individual members. F. E. Griffin was the president of FPM at the time.
