= Moving least squares =

Method for reconstructing continuous functions

Moving least squares is a method of reconstructing continuous functions from a set of unorganized point samples via the calculation of a weighted least squares measure biased towards the region around the point at which the reconstructed value is requested.

In computer graphics, the moving least squares method is useful for reconstructing a surface from a set of points. Often it is used to create a 3D surface from a point cloud through either downsampling or upsampling.

In numerical analysis to handle contributions of geometry where it is difficult to obtain discretizations, the moving least squares methods have also been used and generalized to solve PDEs on curved surfaces and other geometries. This includes numerical methods developed for curved surfaces for solving scalar parabolic PDEs and vector-valued hydrodynamic PDEs.

In machine learning, moving least squares methods have also been used to develop model classes and learning methods. This includes function regression methods and neural network function and operator regression approaches, such as GMLS-Nets.

== Definition ==
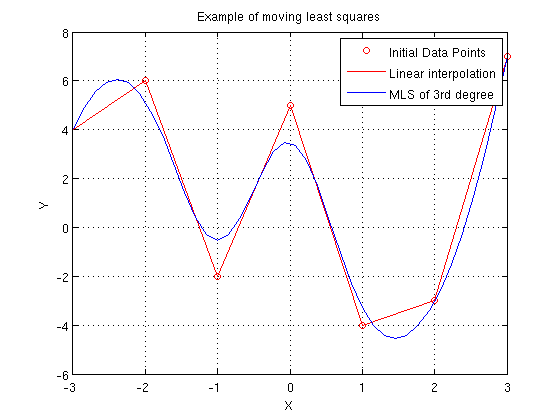
Here is a 1D example. The circles are the sample points and the polygon is a linear interpolation. The blue curve is a smooth approximation of order 3.

Consider a function $f: \mathbb{R}^n \to \mathbb{R}$ and a set of sample points $S = \{ (x_i,f_i) | f(x_i) = f_i \}$. Then, the moving least square approximation of degree $m$ at the point $x$ is $\tilde{p}(x)$ where $\tilde{p}$ minimizes the weighted least-square error

$$\sum_{i \in I} (p(x_i)-f_i)^2\theta(\|x-x_i\|)$$

over all polynomials $p$ of degree $m$ in $\mathbb{R}^n$. $\theta(s)$ is the weight and it tends to zero as $s\to \infty$.

In the example $\theta(s) = e^{-s^2}$. The smooth interpolator of "order 3" is a quadratic interpolator.

== See also ==
- Local regression
- Diffuse element method
- Moving average
