= Milgram =

Milgram is a surname derived from the Yiddish word for pomegranate (מילגרוים, Milgroim) and may refer to:

- Arthur Milgram (1912–1961), American mathematician
  - R. James Milgram (born 1939), American mathematician, son of Arthur
- Stanley Milgram (1933–1984), Yale psychologist
  - Milgram experiment, his most famous study
- Goldie Milgram (born 1955), American reconstructionist Rabbi and author
- Anne Milgram (born 1970), former Attorney General of New Jersey; head of the U.S. Drug Enforcement Administration since 2021
- Maureen Milgram Forrest, the founder chair and current chair, Leicesterherday Trust, Leicester
- MILGRAM, Japanese musical project by DECO*27 and Yamanaka Takuya, managed by OTOIRO.

== See also ==
- Milgram & Company Ltd., a Canadian logistics company
- Babuška–Lax–Milgram theorem, in mathematics
- Lax–Milgram theorem
- Lions–Lax–Milgram theorem, in mathematics
- Milligram, a unit of measurement

Related surnames

- Milgrim
- Milgrom
