= Hurtubise =

Hurtubise is a Canadian surname. Notable people with this name include:

- Jacques Hurtubise (painter) (1939–2014), Montreal-born and Nova Scotia-based abstract expressionist
- Jacques Hurtubise (cartoonist), (1950–2015), a.k.a. Zyx, Canadian cartoonist, founder of Croc magazine, and political candidate
- Jacques Hurtubise (mathematician) (b. 1957), Rhodes Scholar and McGill University professor
- Jim Hurtubise (1932–1989), American race car driver
- Louise Hurtubise (b. 1953), Canadian handball player at the 1976 Olympics
- Mark Hurtubise (b. 1984), professional ice hockey player
- Raoul Hurtubise (1882–1955), Canadian Senator for Nipissing
- Troy Hurtubise (1963–2018), Canadian inventor and conservationist

== See also ==
- Hurtubise House in Westmount, Quebec
- Jacques Hurtubise (disambiguation)
