= Fichera's existence principle =

Theorem in functional analysis

In mathematics, and particularly in functional analysis, Fichera's existence principle is an existence and uniqueness theorem for solution of functional equations, proved by Gaetano Fichera in 1954. More precisely, given a general vector space V and two linear maps from it onto two Banach spaces, the principle states necessary and sufficient conditions for a linear transformation between the two dual Banach spaces to be invertible for every vector in V.

== See also ==
- Banach fixed-point theorem – Theorem about metric spaces
- Babuška–Lax–Milgram theorem – Mathematical theorem
- Lax–Milgram theorem – Mathematical tools
- Lions–Lax–Milgram theorem – Functional analysis theorem
- Surjection of Fréchet spaces – Characterization of surjectivity
