= Ursell =

Ursell is a surname. Notable people with the surname include:

- Fritz Ursell (1923–2012), British mathematician
- Geoffrey Ursell (1943–2021), Canadian writer
- Harold Douglas Ursell (1907–1969), English mathematician

== See also ==
- Pursell
- Ursell function
- Ursell number
