= Jacques Hurtubise =

Jacques Hurtubise may refer to:

- Jacques Hurtubise (painter) (1939–2014), Canadian abstract painter
- Jacques Hurtubise (cartoonist) or Zyx (1950–2015), French-Canadian cartoonist, founder of Croc magazine, and political candidate
- Jacques Hurtubise (mathematician) (born 1957), Canadian mathematician
