= Milgrom =

Milgrom is a surname derived from the Yiddish word for pomegranate (מילגרוים, Milgroim) and may refer to:

- Allen "Al" Milgrom (born 1950), American comic book writer
- Felix Milgrom (1919-2007), Jewish Polish-American microbiologist
- Jacob Milgrom (1923-2010), Jewish Biblical scholar
- Lionel Milgrom, British chemist and homeopath
- Marcia Milgrom Dodge, an American director, choreographer and writer
- Mordehai Milgrom (born 1946), Israeli physicist
- Naomi Milgrom, Australian business owner
- Paul Milgrom (born 1948), American economist

== See also ==
- Milgram
- Milgrim
