= Dudley Weldon Woodard =

American mathematician

Dudley Weldon Woodard (October 3, 1881 – July 1, 1965) was a Galveston-born American mathematician and professor, and the second African-American to earn a PhD in mathematics; the first was Woodard's mentor Elbert Frank Cox, who earned a PhD from Cornell in 1925.

He received his B.A. degree from Wilberforce University in Ohio (1903), his B.S. degree (1906) and M.Sc. degree (1907) at the University of Chicago. He taught collegiate mathematics in Tuskegee for many years, until finally he earned his PhD at the University of Pennsylvania (1928). His doctoral thesis was entitled, On Two-Dimensional Analysis Situs with Special Reference to the Jordan Curve Theorem, and was advised by John R. Kline.

During his lifetime, he published three papers. The second of these, The Characterization of the Closed N-Cell in Fundamenta Mathematicae, 13 (1929), is, according to Scott Williams, Professor of Mathematics at the State University of New York-Buffalo, the first paper published in an accredited mathematics journal by an African American. He also published a study for the Committee of twelve for the advancement of the interests of the Negro race on Jackson, Mississippi in 1909, a textbook, Practical Arithmetic (1911), and an article on geometry teaching at Tuskegee in 1913.

Woodard was a respected mathematician, professor and mentor to his students at Howard University in Washington DC, where he established the masters program in mathematics. One of his best known students was William Waldron Schieffelin Claytor, who later took his PhD at the University of Pennsylvania (1933), also under Woodard's former advisor, John R. Kline.

Woodard retired in 1947, after having become chairman of the mathematics department. He died on July 15, 1965, at his home in Cleveland, Ohio, aged 83.
