= Milgrim =

Milgrim is a surname derived from the Yiddish word for pomegranate (מילגרוים, Milgroim). Notable people with the surname include:

- Lynn Milgrim (born 1944), American actress
- Roger M. Milgrim, American intellectual property lawyer
- Sally Milgrim (1898–1994), American businesswoman and fashion designer
- Sarah Milgrim, Jewish-American victim of a 2025 shooting

== See also ==
- Milgram, similar surname
- Milgrom, similar surname
