= Arthur Milgram =

American mathematician

Arthur Norton Milgram (3 June 1912 – 30 January 1961) was an American mathematician. He made contributions in functional analysis, combinatorics, differential geometry, topology, partial differential equations, and Galois theory. Perhaps one of his more famous contributions is the Lax–Milgram theorem—a theorem in functional analysis that is particularly applicable in the study of partial differential equations. In the third chapter of Emil Artin's book Galois Theory, Milgram also discussed some applications of Galois theory. Milgram also contributed to graph theory, by co-authoring the article Verallgemeinerung eines graphentheoretischen Satzes von Rédei with Tibor Gallai in 1960.

Milgram was born in Philadelphia, and received his Ph.D. from the University of Pennsylvania in 1937. He worked under the supervision of John Kline (a student of Robert Lee Moore). His dissertation was titled "Decompositions and Dimension of Closed Sets in R^{n}".

Milgram advised 2 students at Syracuse University in the 1940s and 1950s (Robert M. Exner and Adnah Kostenbauder ). In the 1950s, Milgram moved to the University of Minnesota at Minneapolis and helped found Minnesota's well-known PDE group (). At Minnesota, Milgram was also the Ph.D. advisor for Robert Duke Adams . Milgram's son R. James (Richard) Milgram (Professor Emeritus at Stanford ) also studied mathematics and received his Ph.D. from Minnesota.

== Selected publications ==
- Lax, Peter D.; Milgram, Arthur N. (1954), "Parabolic equations", Contributions to the theory of partial differential equations, Annals of Mathematics Studies, vol. 33, Princeton, N. J.: Princeton University Press, pp. 167–190, MR 0067317, Zbl 0058.08703 – via De Gruyter
- Gallai, T.; Milgram, A. N. (1960), "Verallgemeinerung eines graphentheoretischen Satzes von Rédei" [Generalization of a graph theoretical theorem of Rédei], Acta Scientiarum Mathematicarum (in German), 21 (3–4): 181–186, MR 0140442, Zbl 0101.16608, archived from the original on 2016-09-16.
- Milgram, A. N. (1971) [1944], "Chapter III: Applications", Galois Theory, by Artin, Emil, Notre Dame Mathematical Lectures, vol. 2 (reprint of 2nd ed.), Indiana: University of Notre Dame, pp. 69–82, MR 0009934, Zbl 0060.04814.

== See also ==
- Babuška–Lax–Milgram theorem
- Fichera's existence principle
- Lions–Lax–Milgram theorem
