= William Lloyd Garrison Williams =

Canadian-American Quaker mathematician (1888–1976)

- Born: October 3, 1888; Friendship, Kansas
- Died: January 31, 1976 (aged 87)
- Other name: Lloyd Williams
- Education: Haverford College B.A.; University of Oxford (1913, M.A.); University of Chicago (1925, Ph.D)
- Occupation: Mathematician
- Known for: Canadian Mathematical Congress; Elbert Frank Cox Ph.D
- Partner: Anne Skyes (1917)
- Children: 2

William Lloyd Garrison Williams (October 3, 1888 – January 31, 1976) was an American-Canadian Quaker and mathematician, known for the founding of the Canadian Mathematical Society and overseeing Elbert Frank Cox's doctorate in mathematics.

== Personal life ==
Williams was born in Friendship, Kansas to Amanda Dunreath Truex and Nathan Williams. After the death of his mother, he was taken in by his father's first wife's family, the Tomlinsons in Indiana.

Williams married Anne Skyes, a pianist from Cincinnati, in 1917. Together, they had two daughters, Hester and mathematician Christine Ayoub.

== Academic career ==
After attending the Quaker Academy, Williams taught in North Dakota. He then studied Classics at Haverford. Subsequently, he was awarded a Rhodes Scholarship, where he studied mathematics at Oxford from 1910 to 1913. Once obtaining an M.A. he took on a faculty position at the Miami University. During the summers, he did Ph.D. work at the University of Chicago. He wrote his Ph.D. on Fundamental Systems of Formal Modular Seminvariants of the Binary Cubic, published in 1920. He then taught briefly at Gettysburg College and William and Mary, before relocating to Cornell.

In 1924, Williams moved again, this time to teach at McGill, to develop their graduate program. He remained there until his retirement in 1954. He was awarded honorary degrees by the University of Montreal, University of Manitoba, Dalhousie University, and Mount Allison University.

== Elbert Frank Cox ==
Williams supervised the Ph.D. of Elbert Frank Cox, the first African American to get a mathematics doctorate, during his time at Cornell. When Williams took up his position at McGill, Cox followed him. Cox was awarded his degree in 1925, utilizing the Erastus Brooks Fellowship.

Unsatisfied with the limited amount of recognition Cox received, Williams petitioned international universities to recognise his student, eventually convincing the Sendai University, Japan.

== Canadian Mathematical Congress ==
Williams founded the Canadian Mathematical Society, formerly the Canadian Mathematical Congress, in 1945. Williams dreamed of a forum to bring Canadian mathematicians together, regardless of race or creed, especially after attending the Toronto Congress in 1924 where all mathematicians of the Central Powers had been excluded. He worked as the treasurer from its founding in 1945 to 1963. He was particularly successful in achieving support from insurance companies, although he was noted by many to be quite zealous and friendly and found support from many.

Currently the Jeffrey-Williams Prize is named in his honour, and awarded to mathematicians who have made outstanding contributions to mathematical research by the Canadian Mathematical Society.

== Religious beliefs ==
A devoted Quaker, Williams was instrumental in the Montreal Quaker community during the 1930s and beyond. These beliefs influenced his views of racial equality and hard work. Williams pioneered Quaker causes. He was a member of the Board of the Canadian Friends Service Committee and chairman of the committee from 1959 until 1963. He founded the Montreal “Save the Children” Fund in 1944. He additionally helped with the purchasing of a building for Montreal friends to use as a meeting house, although it is no longer in use. He is noted for being an official of the Quakers of Montreal.
