= Kline sphere characterization =

Suitable space separated by any simple closed curve but by no 2 points, is a 2-sphere

In mathematics, a Kline sphere characterization, named after John Robert Kline, is a topological characterization of a two-dimensional sphere in terms of what sort of subset separates it. Its proof was one of the first notable accomplishments of R. H. Bing; Bing gave an alternate proof using brick partitioning in his paper Complementary domains of continuous curves

A simple closed curve in a two-dimensional sphere (for instance, its equator) separates the sphere into two pieces upon removal. If one removes a pair of points from a sphere, however, the remainder is connected. Kline's sphere characterization states that the converse is true: If a nondegenerate locally connected metric continuum is separated by any simple closed curve but by no pair of points, then it is a two-dimensional sphere.
