= Christine Ayoub =

Canadian and American mathematician and Quaker

Christine Sykes Williams Ayoub (1922–2024) was a Canadian and American mathematician specializing in commutative algebra and a professor of mathematics at Pennsylvania State University. A Quaker and descendant of Quakers, she also edited a book of biographies of Quakers.

== Early life and education ==
Ayoub was the daughter of William Lloyd Garrison Williams, also a Canadian and American mathematician, and his wife, pianist Anne Sykes. She was born on February 7, 1922, in Cincinnati. Although her father was working at Cornell University in Ithaca, New York at the time, her mother, originally from Cincinnati, went to her family home in Cincinnati for the births of both Ayoub and her older sister, Hester. In 1924, her father moved to McGill University in Montreal, Canada, and she grew up in Montreal. Her first school, in 1928, was "an Italian school in Rome", where her mother was wintering; the family trip to Italy also included the 1928 International Congress of Mathematicians in Bologna. Later, she attended both English-language and French-language schools in Montreal, including the Trafalgar School for Girls, from which she graduated young, in 1938.

Intent on studying mathematics, but avoiding her father's department at McGill despite earning top admission scores there, she entered Bryn Mawr College in 1939, where (after the 1935 death of Emmy Noether) the mathematics department was headed by Anna Johnson Pell Wheeler. After graduating "at the top of her class", she did a master's degree program at Radcliffe College. There, she took courses with Saunders Mac Lane and Hassler Whitney and, inspired by Mac Lane, decided to focus on algebra, despite Wheeler's preference for mathematical analysis.

Because her Radcliffe master's degree did not have a thesis, she returned to McGill University for a second master's degree, in 1945, the year that her father was starting the Canadian Mathematical Congress. She completed a Ph.D. in 1947, at Yale University, with the dissertation A Theory of Normal Chains. The Mathematics Genealogy Project lists this work as jointly supervised by Reinhold Baer and Nathan Jacobson. In a 2014 interview, she stated that it would have been directed by Øystein Ore had he not been on leave that year, that instead it was directed by Baer, whom she had visited at the University of Illinois, and that Jacobson, newly arrived at Yale, served as her outside examiner.

== Career and later life ==
She became a postdoctoral research fellow and member of the School of Mathematics at the Institute for Advanced Study in Princeton, New Jersey from 1947 to 1948, with the support of a fellowship from the Office of Naval Research. Although she hoped to work there with Emil Artin at Princeton University, he turned out to be uninterested in working with women. (Artin had worked with Noether, but famously remarked that "she wasn't a woman".)

After an interview at the University of Michigan, whose chair Theophil Henry Hildebrandt told her that a man in her position would have been hired without an interview, she was hired by the Cornell University mathematics department as an instructor in 1947, later learning that there had been a big fight among the Cornell mathematics faculty over whether to hire a woman. In 1950, she married Raymond Ayoub, a Canadian mathematician of Lebanese descent who had been a student of her father. She continued teaching at Cornell until 1951, and in 1951–1952 was a postdoctoral fellow at Harvard University, supported by the National Science Foundation.

In 1952, both Ayoubs moved to the mathematics department at Pennsylvania State University, in State College, Pennsylvania. At Penn State, she became the first algebraist in a new program, and for many years was the only woman faculty member in the entire College of Science. She and her husband both directed large graduate programs, encompassing "more theses than all the rest of the department put together". She also had two daughters, Cynthia in 1953 and Daphne in 1956. After retiring in 1984, she became a professor emerita.

Ayoub "was descended from generations of Quakers", active in the State College Meeting of the Quakers, and a leader in the meeting's oral history project. After retiring, she and her husband helped found a Quaker retirement community in State College, which they moved into in 1997, and regularly traveled to teach in the Middle East. She published a book on Quaker biography, Memories of the Quaker Past: Stories of Thirty-seven Senior Quakers, in 2014.

Her husband died in 2013, and Ayoub died on July 18, 2024, in State College.
