= John Robert Kline =

American mathematician

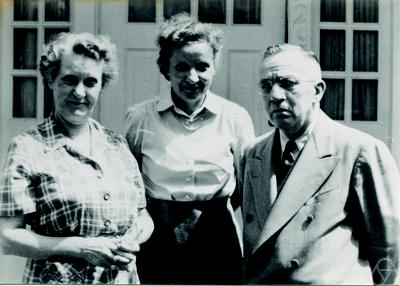
- John Robert Kline (right)
- Born: December 7, 1891; Quakertown, Pennsylvania, U.S.
- Died: May 2, 1955 (aged 63); Quakertown, Pennsylvania, U.S.
- Education: University of Pennsylvania
- Known for: Kline sphere characterization
- Scientific career
- Fields: Mathematics
- Workplaces: University of Pennsylvania
- Doctoral advisor: R. L. Moore
- Doctoral students: Athanasios Papoulis; Lida Barrett; Donald Flanders; Joseph Harrison Kusner; Arthur Milgram; William Schieffelin Claytor; D. Weldon Woodard; Leo Zippin

John Robert Kline (December 7, 1891 – May 2, 1955) was an American mathematician and educator.

== Biography ==
One of three children born to Henry K. Kline and Emma M. Kline, he was Professor of mathematics at the University of Pennsylvania from 1920 to 1955. A Ph.D. student of Robert Lee Moore, he was a Guggenheim Fellow in 1925, later Chairman of the Department of Mathematics from 1933 to 1954, and Thomas A. Scott Professor of Mathematics from 1941 to 1955.

His doctoral students include Lida Barrett, Donald Flanders, Joseph Harrison Kusner, Arthur Milgram, Athanasios Papoulis, Dudley Weldon Woodard, Leo Zippin, and William Waldron Schieffelin Claytor.

Kline was elected to the American Philosophical Society in 1941.

== Partial bibliography ==
- John Robert Kline (1919). "Concerning Sense on Closed Curves in Non-Metrical Plane Analysis Situs". The Annals of Mathematics. 21 (2). Annals of Mathematics: 113–119. doi:10.2307/2007227. JSTOR 2007227.
- John Robert Kline (January 1923). "Closed Connected Sets Which Are Disconnected by the Removal of a Finite Number of Points". Proc Natl Acad Sci USA. 9 (1): 7–12. Bibcode:1923PNAS....9....7K. doi:10.1073/pnas.9.1.7. PMC 1085211. PMID 16586914.
- John Robert Kline (May 1924). "Concerning the Division of the Plane by Continua". Proc Natl Acad Sci USA. 10 (5): 176–177. Bibcode:1924PNAS...10..176K. doi:10.1073/pnas.10.5.176. PMC 1085587. PMID 16576811.
- John Robert Kline (1927). "Concerning the sum of a countable infinity of mutually exclusive continua". Mathematische Zeitschrift. 26: 687–690. doi:10.1007/BF01475482. S2CID 121489783.
