= Exponential formula =

In combinatorial mathematics, the exponential formula (called the polymer expansion in physics) states that the exponential generating function for structures on finite sets is the exponential of the exponential generating function for connected structures. The exponential formula is a power series version of a special case of Faà di Bruno's formula.

== Algebraic statement ==
Here is a purely algebraic statement, as a first introduction to the combinatorial use of the formula.

For any formal power series of the form
$$f(x) = a_1 x + a_2 \frac{x^2}{2} + a_3 \frac{x^3}{6} + \dots + a_n \frac{x^n}{n!} + \dots$$
we have
$$\exp f(x) = e^{f(x)} = \sum_{n=0}^\infty b_n \frac{x^n}{n!}$$
where
$$b_n = \sum_{\pi=\left\{ S_1, \dots, S_k \right\}} a_{\left|S_1\right|} \cdots a_{\left|S_k\right|}$$
and the index $\pi$ runs through all partitions $\{ S_1, \ldots, S_k \}$ of the set $\{ 1,\ldots, n \}$. (When $k = 0$, the product is empty and by definition equals $1$.)

=== Other expressions ===
- One can write the exponential formula in the following form
  $$b_n = B_n(a_1, a_2, \dots, a_n)$$
  and thus
  $$\exp\left( \sum_{n=1}^\infty a_n \frac{x^n}{n!} \right) = \sum_{n=0}^\infty B_n(a_1,\dots,a_n) \frac{x^n}{n!}$$
  where $B_n(a_1, \ldots, a_n)$ is the $n$^{th} complete Bell polynomial.
- The exponential formula can also be written as follows:
  $$\exp\left( \sum_{n=1}^\infty a_n \frac{x^n}{n} \right) = \sum_{n=0}^\infty Z_n(a_1, \dots, a_n) x^n$$
  where $Z_n$ stands for the cycle index polynomial for the symmetric group $S_n$, defined as:
  $$Z_n(a_1, \dots, a_n) = \frac{1}{n!} \sum_{\sigma\in S_n} a_1^{\sigma_1} \cdots a_n^{\sigma_n}$$
  and $\sigma_j$ denotes the number of cycles of $\sigma$ of size $j \in \{1, \dots, n\}$. This is a consequence of the general relation between $Z_n$ and Bell polynomials:
  $$n! Z_n(a_1, \dots, a_n) = B_n(0!\,a_1, 1!\,a_2, \dots, (n-1)!\,a_n).$$

== Combinatorial interpretation ==
In combinatorial applications, the numbers $a_n$ count the number of some sort of "connected" structure on an $n$-point set, and the numbers $b_n$ count the number of (possibly disconnected) structures (see combinatorial species). The numbers $b_n/n!$ count the number of isomorphism classes of structures on $n$ points, with each structure being weighted by the reciprocal of its automorphism group, and the numbers $a_n/n!$ count isomorphism classes of connected structures in the same way.

== Examples ==
- $b_3 = B_3(a_1,a_2,a_3) = a_3 + 3a_2 a_1 + a_1^3,$ because there is one partition of the set $\{1,2,3\}$ that has a single block of size $3$, there are three partitions of $\{1,2,3\}$ that split it into a block of size $2$ and a block of size $1$, and there is one partition of $\{1,2,3\}$ that splits it into three blocks of size $1$. This also follows from $Z_3 (a_1,a_2,a_3) = {1 \over 6}(2 a_3 + 3 a_1 a_2 + a_1^3) = {1 \over 6} B_3 (a_1, a_2, 2 a_3)$, since one can write the group $S_3$ as $S_3 = \{ (1)(2)(3), (1)(23), (2)(13), (3)(12), (123), (132) \}$, using cyclic notation for permutations.
- If $b_n = 2^{n(n-1)/2}$ is the number of graphs whose vertices are a given $n$-point set, then $a_n$ is the number of connected graphs whose vertices are a given $n$-point set.
- There are numerous variations of the previous example where the graph has certain properties: for example, if $b_n$ counts graphs without cycles, then $a_n$ counts trees (connected graphs without cycles).
- If $b_n$ counts directed graphs whose edges (rather than vertices) are a given $n$ point set, then $a_n$ counts connected directed graphs with this edge set.
- In quantum field theory and statistical mechanics, the partition functions $Z$, or more generally correlation functions, are given by a formal sum over Feynman diagrams. The exponential formula shows that $\ln(Z)$ can be written as a sum over connected Feynman diagrams, in terms of connected correlation functions.

== See also ==
- Surjection of Fréchet spaces – Characterization of surjectivity
