= Pursell =

Surname

Pursell is a surname. Notable people with the surname include:

- Bill Pursell (1926–2020), American composer and former session pianist
- Bob Pursell (footballer born 1889) (1889–1974), footballer
- Bob Pursell (footballer born 1919) (1919–2005), Scottish footballer
- Carl Pursell (1932–2009), politician from the U.S. state of Michigan
- Isaac Pursell (1853–1910), Philadelphia, Pennsylvania-based architect
- Peter Pursell (1894–1968), Scottish footballer

== See also ==
- Purell
- Ursell
