= Charles P. Boyer =

American mathematician

Charles Place Boyer (born April 1942) is an American mathematician, specializing in differential geometry and moduli spaces. He is known as one of the four mathematicians who jointly proved in 1992 the Atiyah–Jones conjecture.

Boyer graduated from Pennsylvania State University with a B.S. in 1966 and a Ph.D. in 1972. His thesis, Field Theory on a Seven-Dimensional Homogeneous Space of the Poincaré Group, was written under the supervision of Gordon N. Fleming. After receiving his Ph.D. Boyer worked for a number of years at the Instituto de Investigaciones en Matemáticas Aplicadas y en Sistemas (IIMAS) of the Universidad Nacional Autónoma de México (UNAM). At IIMAS-UNAM he was a visiting researcher from 1972 to 1973, a researcher (Asociado C) from 1974 to 1975, a researcher (Titular A) from 1975 to 1978, and a researcher (Titular B) from 1978 to 1981. From 1973 to 1974 he was a visiting researcher at the University of Montreal, and from 1981 to 1982 he was a visiting research fellow at Harvard University. At Clarkson University he was from 1983 to 1988 an associate professor. At the University of New Mexico he was a full professor from 1988 to 2012, retiring as professor emeritus in 2012.

He is the author or co-author of over 100 articles in refereed journals. He worked for many years with Krzysztof Galicki (1958–2007). Their comprehensive monograph (and graduate textbook) Sasakian Geometry was published shortly after Galicki's death. In 2012 Boyer was elected a fellow of the American Mathematical Society.

== See also ==
- Sasakian manifold
