= Athanasios Papoulis =

Greek-American engineer and applied mathematician (1921–2002)

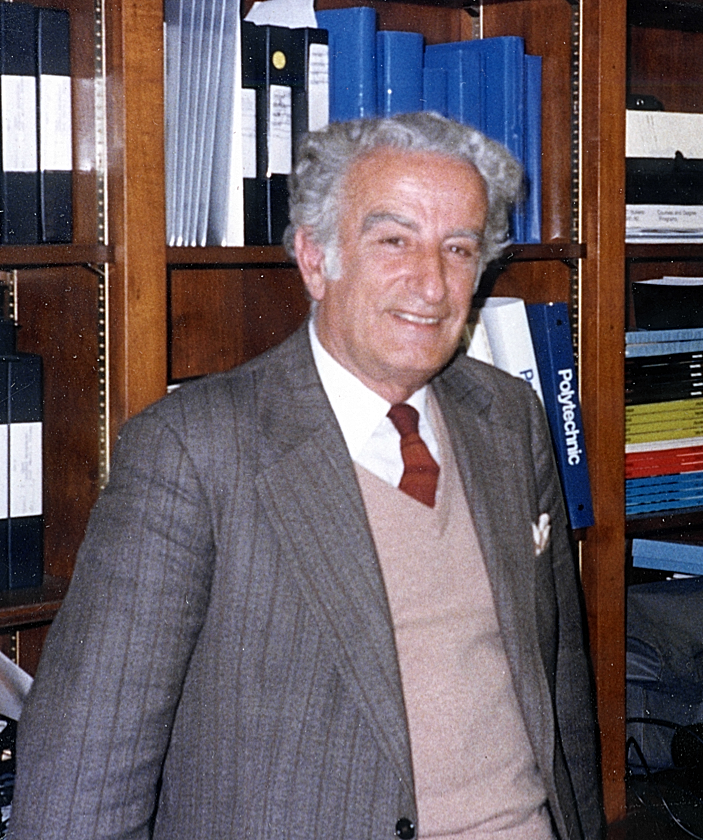
- Athanasios Papoulis, c. 1989
- Born: 1921; Turkey
- Died: April 25, 2002 (aged 80–81)
- Education: University of Pennsylvania; National Technical University of Athens
- Scientific career
- Doctoral advisor: John Robert Kline

Athanasios Papoulis (Greek: Αθανάσιος Παπούλης; 1921 – April 25, 2002) was a Greek-American engineer and applied mathematician.

== Life ==
Papoulis was born in modern day Turkey in 1921, and his family was moved to Athens, Greece in 1922 as a consequence of the Population exchange between Greece and Turkey. He earned his undergraduate degree from National Technical University of Athens. In 1945, he stowed away on a boat to escape the impending Greek Civil War and settled in the United States. He studied under the supervision of John Robert Kline at the University of Pennsylvania and earned his Ph.D. in Mathematics in 1950. His dissertation was titled On the Strong Differentiation of the Indefinite Integral.

He married Caryl Engwall in New York, New York in 1953, and had five children: Irene, Helen, James, Ann, and Mary. In 1952, after teaching briefly at Union College, he became a faculty member at the Polytechnic Institute of Brooklyn (now Polytechnic Institute of New York University), where he earned the distinction of University Professor.

=== Studies ===
Papoulis contributed in the areas of signal processing, communications, and signal and system theory. His classic book Probability, Random Variables, and Stochastic Processes is used as a textbook in many graduate-level probability courses in electrical engineering departments all over the world.

Two classic texts aimed at [engineering] practitioners were [first] published in 1965... [One was] Athanasios Papoulis' Probability, Random Variables, and Stochastic Processes... These books popularized a pedagogy that balanced rigor and intuition.

By staying away from complete mathematical rigor while emphasizing the physical and engineering interpretations of probability, Papoulis's book gained wide popularity.

=== Theory ===
Athanasios Papoulis specialized in engineering mathematics, his work covers probability, statistics, and estimation in the application of these fields to modern engineering problems. Papoulis also taught and developed subjects such as stochastic simulation, mean square estimation, likelihood tests, maximum entropy methods, Monte Carlo method, spectral representations and estimation, sampling theory, bispectrum and system identification, cyclostationary processes, deterministic signals in noise (part of deterministic systems and dynamical system studies), wave optics and the Wiener and Kalman filters.

==== Contributions ====
- Papoulis's generalization of the sampling theorem unified many variations of the Nyquist–Shannon sampling theorem into one theorem.
- The Papoulis–Gerchberg algorithm is an iterative signal restoration algorithm that has found widespread use in signal and image processing.
- "Papoulis's eloquent proof" of the conventional sampling theorem requires only two equations.

== Bibliography ==
- The Fourier Integral and its Applications by Papoulis, Athanasios, McGraw-Hill Companies (June 1, 1962), ISBN 0-07-048447-3, LCCN 62--10211.
- Probability, Random Variables, and Stochastic Processes by Papoulis, Athanasios 1965. McGraw-Hill Kogakusha, Tokyo, 9th edition, ISBN 0-07-119981-0
- Signal Analysis by Athanasios Papoulis Publisher: McGraw-Hill Companies (May 1977) ISBN 0-07-048460-0 ISBN 978-0070484603
- Systems and Transforms With Applications in Optics by Athanasios Papoulis Publisher: Krieger Pub Co (June 1981) ISBN 0-89874-358-3 ISBN 978-0898743586
- Probability and Statistics by Athanasios Papoulis Publisher: Prentice Hall (September 1989) ISBN 0137116985 ISBN 978-0137116980
- Circuits and Systems – A modern approach by Athanasios Papoulis Publisher: Holt, Rinehart and Winston, Inc. (1980) ISBN 0030560977
