= William Schieffelin Claytor =

American topologist and mathematician (1908–1967)

William Schieffelin Claytor (January 4, 1908 – July 14, 1967) was an American mathematician specializing in topology. He was born in Norfolk, Virginia, where his father was a dentist. He was the third African-American to receive a PhD. in mathematics, and published two papers in the Annals of Mathematics.

== Education ==
Claytor attended public schools in Washington, DC and also the Hampton Agricultural and Industrial School in Virginia. In 1928 he received his BA from Howard University, where he had been taught by Elbert Cox, the first African-American to get a Ph.D. in mathematics. Dudley Woodard, the second African-American to get a PhD in mathematics, was just setting up the graduate program in math at Howard, and Claytor earned his MA there in 1929, with a thesis supervised by Woodard.

Claytor obtained his Ph.D. from the University of Pennsylvania in 1933 with the dissertation Topological Immersion of Peanian Continua in a Spherical Surface, directed by John R. Kline, who had also supervised Woodard's thesis and was himself a student of R. L. Moore (of the Moore method). Kline wrote to Moore saying: "Claytor wrote a very fine thesis. In many ways I think that it is perhaps the best that I have ever had done under my direction."

In 1934, a paper based on Claytor's thesis appeared in Annals of Mathematics, credited to Schieffelin Claytor. In 1937, also in the Annals, he published the paper "Peanian Continua not Imbeddable in a Spherical Surface", also credited to Schieffelin Claytor.

== Academic career ==
Claytor had taught at HBCU West Virginia State College for three years following his doctorate, not being able to secure a job at a majority institution due to the prevalent racism of the era. At West Virginia his students included Katherine Johnson who later worked on the space program for NASA.

Claytor applied for a National Research Council Fellowship to work at the Institute for Advanced Study (IAS), which at the time was housed in Princeton University, but was rejected on racial grounds. In 1937 he received a Rosenwald Fellowship at the University of Michigan; he stayed there for several years, but was not allowed to attend research seminars. Oswald Veblen had finally been able to offer him a position at the IAS in 1939, independently of Princeton University, but Claytor turned it down.

During the years 1941–1945, Claytor served in the US Army, teaching in the Anti-Aircraft Artillery Schools in Virginia and Georgia. In 1947 he joined the faculty at Howard, where David Blackwell was then chair of the department of mathematics. Claytor taught at Howard until his retirement in 1965, serving as chair himself along the way.

On August 5, 1947, Claytor married the psychologist Mae Belle Pullins, who also shared his love of mathematics. They had one daughter. He spent the rest of his career at Howard, and despite making many well-received presentations at AMS conferences, he continued to suffer from racial discrimination and was not even allowed to stay in the hotels where the meetings were held.

== Awards ==
The National Association of Mathematicians (NAM) has a lecture series named after Claytor and Woodard.

The American Mathematical Society (AMS) has a mid-career research fellowship, the Claytor-Gilmer Fellowship, named after Claytor and Gloria Ford Gilmer.

== Papers ==
- Peanian continua not embeddable in a spherical surface Ann. of Math. Second Series, Vol. 38, No. 3 (Jul. 1937), pp. 631–646
- Topological immersion of Peanian continua in a spherical surface, Ann. of Math. Second Series, Vol. 35, No. 4 (Oct. 1934), pp. 809–835
