= First inauguration of Franklin D. Roosevelt =

37th United States presidential inauguration

First presidential inauguration of Franklin D. Roosevelt
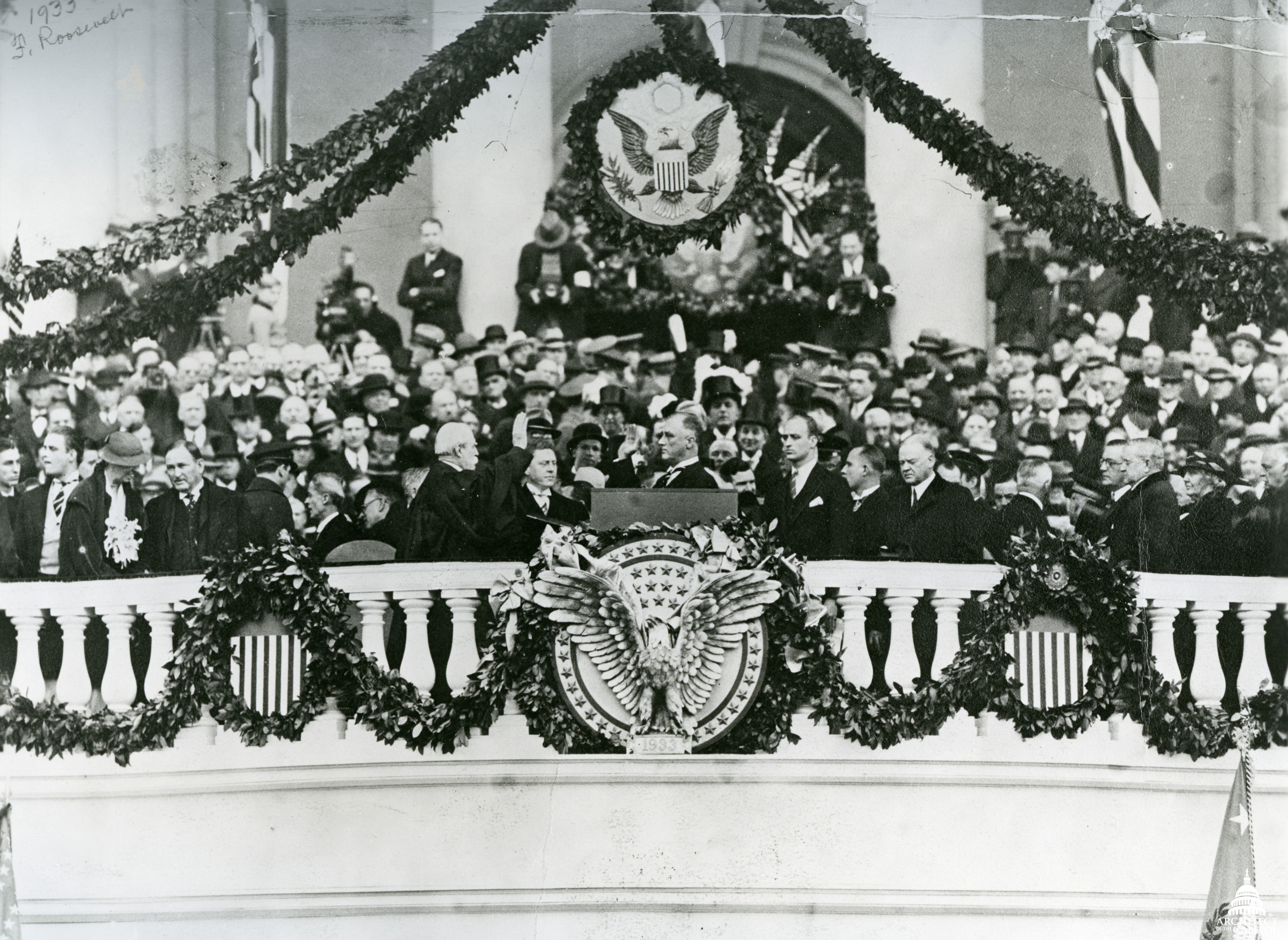
- Date: March 4, 1933; 93 years ago
- Location: United States Capitol, Washington, D.C.
- Organized by: Joint Congressional Committee on Inaugural Ceremonies
- Participants: Franklin D. Roosevelt; 32nd president of the United States — Assuming office Charles Evans Hughes; Chief Justice of the United States — Administering oath John Nance Garner; 32nd vice president of the United States — Assuming office Charles Curtis; 31st vice president of the United States — Administering oath

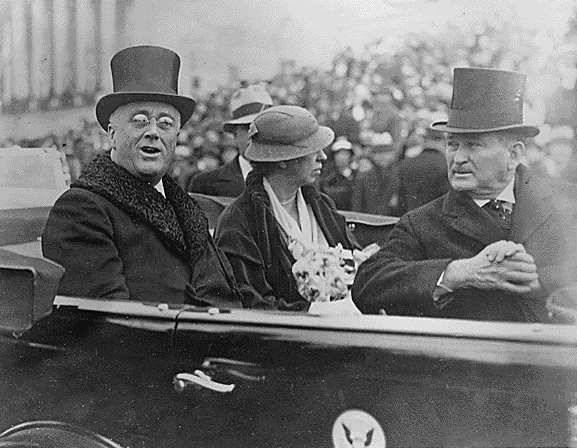
Roosevelt next to his wife and Joseph Robinson

The first inauguration of Franklin D. Roosevelt as the 32nd president of the United States was held on Saturday, March 4, 1933, at the East Portico of the United States Capitol in Washington, D.C. This was the 37th inauguration, and marked the commencement of the first term of Franklin D. Roosevelt as president and John Nance Garner as vice president.

It was also the most recent inauguration to be held on the constitutionally prescribed date of March 4, as the 20th Amendment, ratified earlier that year, moved Inauguration Day to January 20. As a result, the first term of Roosevelt and Garner in office was shorter than a normal term by 43 days. This was also the last time the vice president took the oath of office in the Senate chamber, until the swearing-in of Nelson Rockefeller on December 19, 1974.

The inauguration took place in the wake of Democrat Roosevelt's landslide victory over Republican incumbent Herbert Hoover in the 1932 presidential election. With the nation at its peak of the Great Depression, Roosevelt's inaugural speech was awaited with great anticipation. Broadcast nationwide on several radio networks, the speech was heard by tens of millions of Americans, and set the stage for Roosevelt's urgent efforts to respond to the crisis.

Chief Justice Charles Evans Hughes administered the presidential oath of office at 1:06 PM. Roosevelt wore a morning coat and striped trousers for the inauguration, and took the oath with his hand on his family Bible, open to 1 Corinthians 13. Published in 1686 in Dutch, it remains the oldest Bible ever used in an inaugural ceremony, as well as the only one not in English, and was originally used by Roosevelt for his 1929 and 1931 inaugurations as Governor of New York, and later his three subsequent presidential inaugurations.

== Inaugural speech ==
Roosevelt proceeded to deliver his 1,883-word, 20 minute-long inaugural address, best known for his famously pointed reference to "fear itself" (paraphrasing Thoreau) in one of its first lines (emphasis added):

So, first of all, let me assert my firm belief that the only thing we have to fear is...fear itself — nameless, unreasoning, unjustified terror which paralyzes needed efforts to convert retreat into advance. In every dark hour of our national life, a leadership of frankness and of vigor has met with that understanding and support of the people themselves which is essential to victory. And I am convinced that you will again give that support to leadership in these critical days.

Fear Itself excerpt
Franklin Delano Roosevelt delivering the quoted portion of the address.

Roosevelt used his First Inaugural Speech to outline his plan for the Great Depression. This plan was one he had referred to as a 'new deal' when he accepted the Democratic Party nomination in 1932. America, at the time that Roosevelt was inaugurated, was facing an unemployment rate of over twenty-five percent, which put more than twelve million Americans out of work. Roosevelt used his speech to highlight different parts of his proposed plan.

One part of Roosevelt's plan was to find work for the American people. He stated, "Our greatest primary task is to put people to work. This is no unsolvable problem if we face it wisely and courageously". Roosevelt would later execute this plan by forming different programs such as the Civilian Conservation Corps (CCC) which provided jobs for 300,000 men and the Civil Works Administration (CWA) which provided work by creating "public work projects".

Another part of Roosevelt's plan was to help American farmers. Roosevelt stated, "The task can be helped by definite efforts to raise the values of agricultural products and with this the power to purchase the output of our cities. It can be helped by preventing realistically the tragedy of the growing loss through foreclosure of our small homes and our farms". To put this plan into action Roosevelt created the Agricultural Adjustment Act (AAA) in May 1933. This program helped farmers by giving them incentives to cut production which increased the income of farmers.

The last element that Roosevelt outlined in his speech was his plan for the bank crisis facing America during the Great Depression. He stated, "Finally, in our progress toward a resumption of work we require two safeguards against a return of the evils of the old order: there must be a strict supervision of all banking and credits and investments so that there will be an end to speculation with other people's money, and there must be provision for an adequate but sound currency". Roosevelt declared a banking holiday on March 6, 1933, to stop the runs that were occurring on banks. During this time the banks were inspected to ensure that they would be safe to hold money when the banks reopened. Roosevelt created several programs to stabilize the United States banking system, including the Glass-Steagall Act which guaranteed the savings of American citizens through the Federal Deposit Insurance Corporation and prevented commercial banks from engaging in investment banking

Roosevelt, in his speech, attempted to convince the American people and Congress to follow his plan for the Great Depression.

To do so he first compared the Great Depression to a war. Roosevelt stated, "It can be accomplished in part by direct recruiting by the Government itself, treating the task as we would treat the emergency of a war, but at the same time, through this employment, accomplishing greatly needed projects to stimulate and reorganize the use of our natural resources." This served to both impart on Americans how serious the situation was, but it also helped him justify his plan to Congress because wartime responsibilities fell to the President, not Congress.

The second thing he did in his speech was to state that the Executive Branch may need to have heightened responsibilities, compared to the Legislative Branch, to face the crisis at hand. Roosevelt stated, "It is to be hoped that the normal balance of executive and legislative authority may be wholly adequate to meet the unprecedented task before us. But it may be that an unprecedented demand and need for undelayed action may call for temporary departure from that normal balance of public procedure" This served to justify Roosevelt's plan and the actions that he may need to take in order to accomplish that plan.

Addressing himself to the causes of the economic crisis and its moral dimensions, Roosevelt placed the blame squarely on the greed and shortsightedness of bankers and businessmen, as seen in the following excerpts:

...rulers of the exchange of mankind's goods have failed through their own stubbornness and their own incompetence, have admitted their failure, and have abdicated. Practices of the unscrupulous money changers stand indicted in the court of public opinion, rejected by the hearts and minds of men.

The money changers have fled from their high seats in the temple of our civilization. We may now restore that temple to the ancient truths. The measure of the restoration lies in the extent to which we apply social values more noble than mere monetary profit.

Recognition of the falsity of material wealth as the standard of success goes hand in hand with the abandonment of the false belief that public office and high political position are to be valued only by the standards of pride of place and personal profit; and there must be an end to a conduct in banking and in business which too often has given to a sacred trust the likeness of callous and selfish wrongdoing.

Restoration calls, however, not for changes in ethics alone. This Nation is asking for action, and action now.

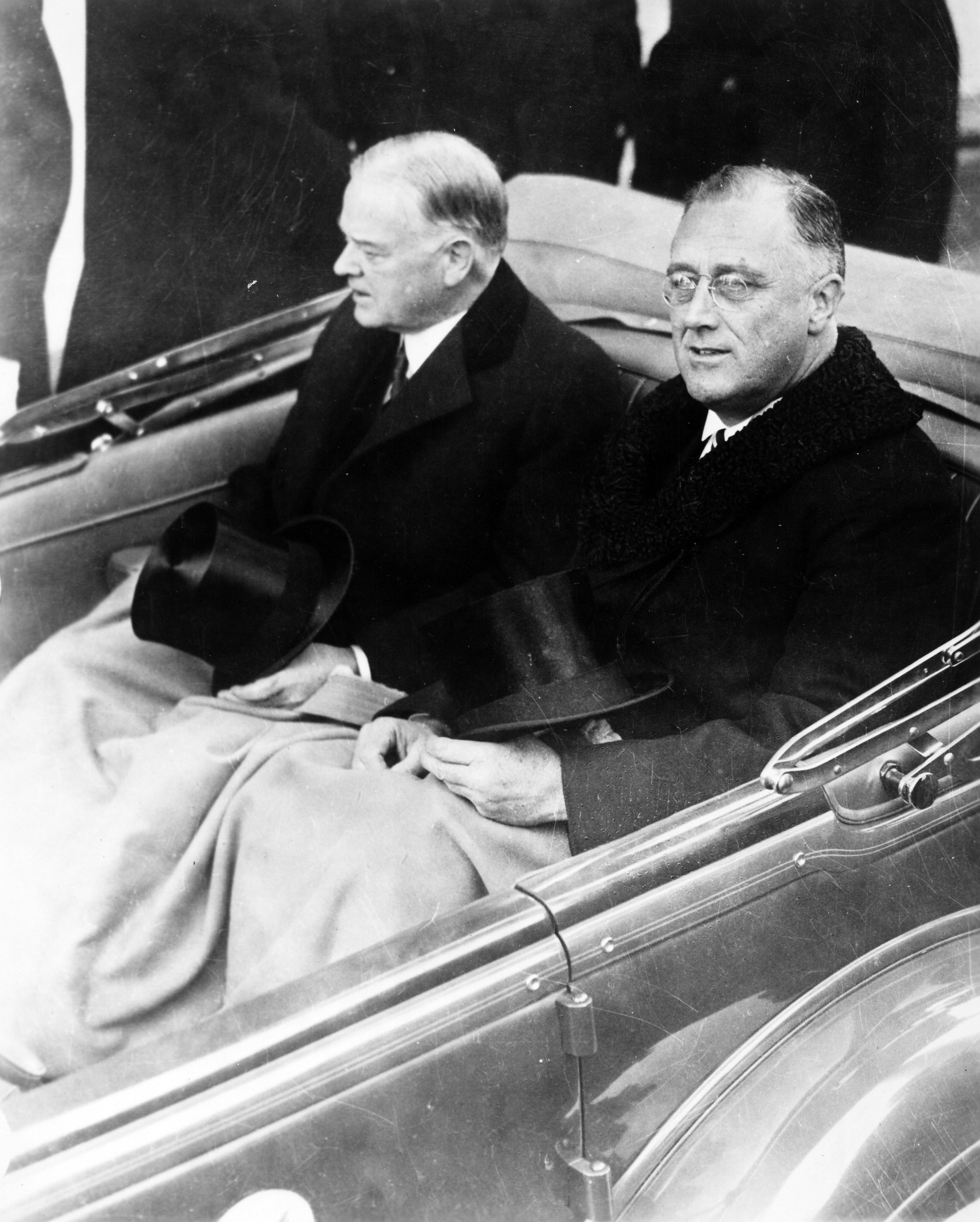
Hoover and Roosevelt on Inauguration Day, 1933.

Roosevelt then turned, in the following excerpts, to the daunting issue of unemployment, which had reached a staggering 25 percent when he assumed office:

...the withered leaves of industrial enterprise lie on every side; farmers find no markets for their produce; the savings of many years in thousands of families are gone.

More important, a host of unemployed citizens face the grim problem of existence, and an equally great number toil with little return. Only a foolish optimist can deny the dark realities of the moment.

Our greatest primary task is to put people to work. This is no unsolvable problem if we face it wisely and courageously.

There are many ways in which it can be helped, but it can never be helped merely by talking about it. We must act and act quickly.

After touching briefly on foreign relations — "the policy of the good neighbor — the neighbor who resolutely respects himself and, because he does so, respects the rights of others" — Roosevelt turned again to the economic crisis, assuring his countrymen that he would act swiftly and with determination:

I am prepared under my constitutional duty to recommend the measures that a stricken Nation in the midst of a stricken world may require. These measures, or such other measures as the Congress may build out of its experience and wisdom, I shall seek, within my constitutional authority, to bring to speedy adoption. But in the event that the Congress shall fail to take one of these two courses, and in the event that the national emergency is still critical, I shall not evade the clear course of duty that will then confront me. I shall ask the Congress for the one remaining instrument to meet the crisis — broad Executive power to wage a war against the emergency, as great as the power that would be given to me if we were in fact invaded by a foreign foe.

== Rhetorical aspects ==
Roosevelt made several very important rhetorical choices in his First Inauguration Speech. He understood that the plan that he was proposing would seem very radical to the American people who were not used to such action outside of wartime. To convince the American people of his plan he outlined how dire the situation was, reassured them that his plan was necessary, and appealed to their sense of patriotism.

The first thing that Roosevelt attempted to do was convince the American people that the situation was extremely dire and needed immediate action. He said, "Values have shrunken to fantastic levels; taxes have risen; our ability to pay has fallen; government of all kinds is faced by serious curtailment of income; the means of exchange are frozen in the currents of trade; the withered leaves of industrial enterprise lie on every side; farmers find no markets for their produce; the savings of many years in thousands of families are gone". America was facing the worst depression in history; Roosevelt outlined the problems facing the country so that the American people would understand his need to take action.

The second thing that Roosevelt did to convince the American people was to justify his need to take on more control to implement his plan. Roosevelt said, "I shall ask the Congress for the one remaining instrument to meet the crisis—broad Executive power to wage a war against the emergency, as great as the power that would be given to me if we were in fact invaded by a foreign foe". By comparing the Great Depression to a war and stating that the only solution to this situation was to give the Executive Branch the ability to fight this 'war', Roosevelt hoped to convince Americans that he needed more power to execute his plan.

The last thing that Roosevelt did was appeal to the patriotism of the American people. He said "We do not distrust the future of essential democracy. The people of the United States have not failed. In their need, they have registered a mandate that they want direct, vigorous action. They have asked for discipline and direction under leadership". Roosevelt hoped to use the idea of patriotism to convince the American people, that despite their distrust for sweeping government action, the steps he planned to take were necessary for America.

After the inaugural address, a woman by the name Sarah Love said "Any man who can talk like that in times like these is worthy of every ounce of support a true American has." Love's quote is reflective of the popular sentiment felt for Roosevelt's dynamic, confident, and inspiring oratory.

Close aide Raymond Moley was responsible for crafting the speech, as he did many of Roosevelt's speeches. The idea of likening Roosevelt's coming task to commanding a war effort originated from Moley.

== Inaugural ball ==
Roosevelt's wife Eleanor wore a light blue dress designed by Sally Milgrim to the inaugural ball. The dress was afterwards displayed at the Smithsonian Institution.

== Aftermath ==
The day after his inauguration, Roosevelt assembled a special session of Congress to declare a four-day bank holiday, and on March 9 signed the Emergency Banking Act, which provided a mechanism for reopening. He continued on for what became his First Hundred Days of the New Deal.

== See also ==
- Causes of the Great Depression
- Great Contraction
- Presidency of Franklin D. Roosevelt
- Second inauguration of Franklin D. Roosevelt
- Third inauguration of Franklin D. Roosevelt
- Fourth inauguration of Franklin D. Roosevelt
- 1932 United States presidential election
