= Lida Barrett =

American mathematician and educator (1927–2021)

Lida K. Barrett
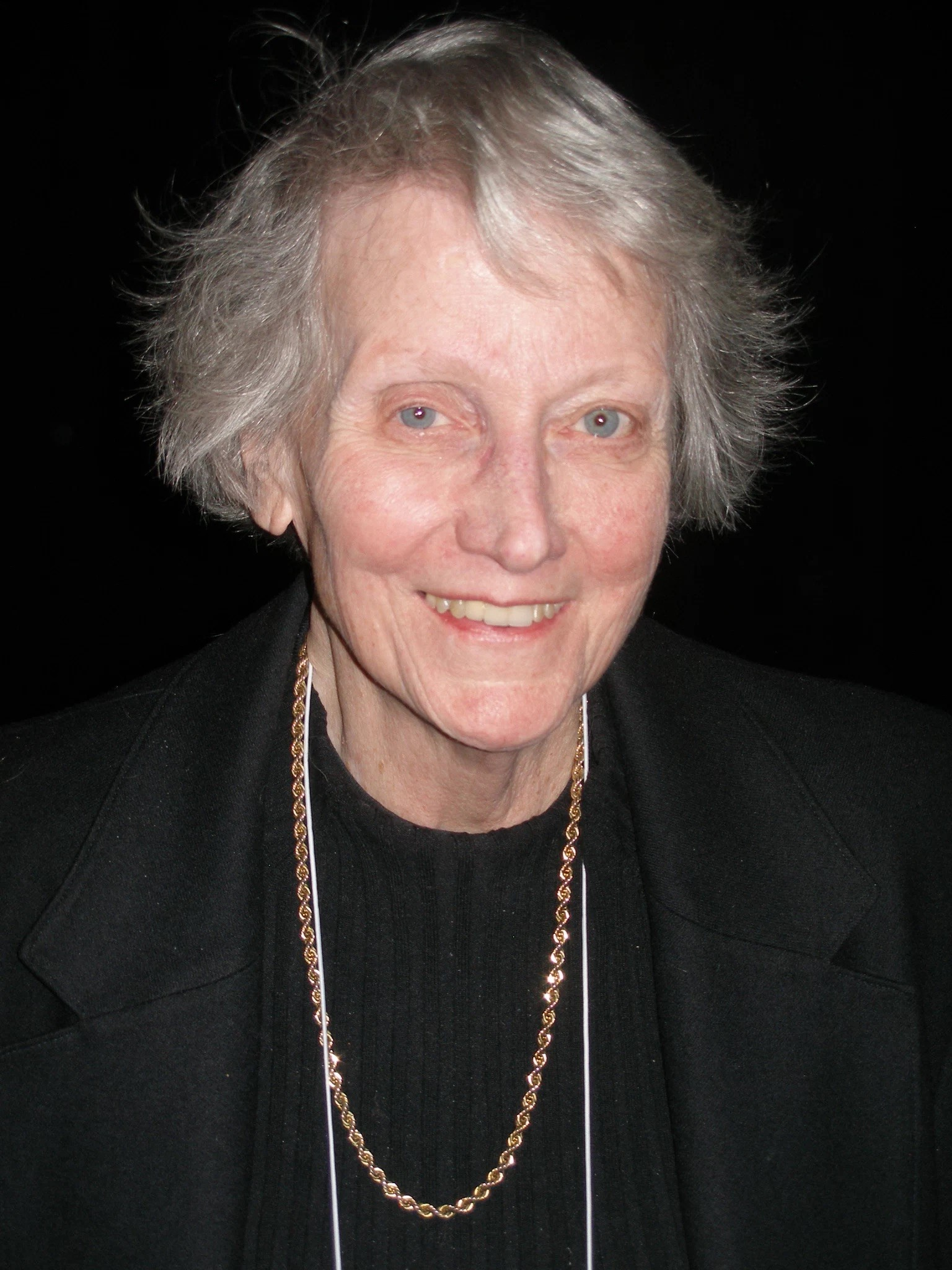
- Barrett in 2008
- Born: Lida Baker Kittrell; May 21, 1927; Houston, Texas
- Died: January 28, 2021 (aged 93); Knoxville, Tennessee
- Education: Rice University; University of Texas; University of Pennsylvania
- Spouse: John Barrett
- Awards: MAA Gung and Hu Distinguished Service to Mathematics Award; Fellow of the American Mathematical Society; Fellow of the Association for Women in Mathematics
- Scientific career
- Thesis: Regular Curves and Regular Points of Finite Order (1954)
- Doctoral advisor: J. R. Kline

Lida Baker Kittrell Barrett (May 21, 1927 – January 28, 2021) was an American mathematics professor and administrator. She served on many committees and boards and contributed to mathematics, mathematics education, and increasing the participation of members of underrepresented groups in mathematics. She served as president of the Mathematical Association of America (MAA) in 1989 and 1990.

== Early life and education ==
Lida Baker Kittrell was born on May 21, 1927, in Houston, Texas. She earned her baccalaureate, masters, and doctorate degrees in mathematics from Rice University (1946), the University of Texas at Austin (1949), and the University of Pennsylvania (1954), respectively. Her 1954 doctoral dissertation, Regular Curves and Regular Points of Finite Order, was supervised by John Robert Kline.

== Career ==
She taught briefly at the Texas State College for Women in Denton, now Texas Woman's University.

Barrett served as a mathematics faculty member at the universities of Utah and Tennessee, and headed the mathematics department at the University of Tennessee from 1973 to 1980. During her tenure there, she also worked at the Oak Ridge National Laboratory in applied mathematics. She served as an administrator and mathematics faculty member at Northern Illinois University, where she was Associate Provost, and at Mississippi State University (MSU), where she was Dean of Arts and Sciences. After retirement as Dean Emerita from MSU, she was a Senior Associate to the head of the Education Directorate at the National Science Foundation for three years and then served as a Professor of Mathematics at the United States Military Academy at West Point for three years. She died in Knoxville, Tennessee, on January 28, 2021.

== Notable positions ==
From 1979 to 1982, Barrett chaired the American Mathematical Society's Committee on Employment and Educational Policy. She served as president of the Mathematical Association of America (MAA) in 1989–1990; she was the second woman to serve as president of the MAA . She was on the planning committee for the International Congress in Mathematics Education in Madrid, Spain, in July 1996. She was a member of the advisory committee of the Harvard Calculus Consortium and of the Adolescence and Young Adult/Mathematics Standards committee for the National Board of Professional Teaching Standards.

== Recognition ==
In 2008 she received the MAA Yueh-Gin Gung and Dr. Charles Y. Hu Award for Distinguished Service to Mathematics. She was a fellow of the American Mathematical Society and part of the 2019 class of fellows of the Association for Women in Mathematics (AWM). Her AWM fellow citation read "for her profound and long-lasting effect in diversifying the committees and leadership of the MAA, during and beyond her term as its second woman president; for her value to the mathematics community as a pioneer and defender of women and underrepresented groups".
