= Coercive function =

Mathematical function

In mathematics, a coercive function is a function that "grows rapidly" at the extremes of the space on which it is defined. Depending on the context different exact definitions of this idea are in use.

== Coercive vector fields ==
A vector field f : R^{n} → R^{n} is called coercive if
$$\frac{f(x) \cdot x}{\| x \|} \to + \infty \text{ as } \| x \| \to + \infty,$$
where "$\cdot$" denotes the usual dot product and $\|x\|$ denotes the usual Euclidean norm of the vector x.

A coercive vector field is in particular norm-coercive since $\|f(x)\| \geq (f(x) \cdot x) / \| x \|$ for $x \in \mathbb{R}^n \setminus \{0\}$, by Cauchy–Schwarz inequality. However a norm-coercive mapping f : R^{n} → R^{n} is not necessarily a coercive vector field. For instance the rotation f : R^{2} → R^{2}, f(x) = (−x_{2}, x_{1}) by 90° is a norm-coercive mapping which fails to be a coercive vector field since $f(x) \cdot x = 0$ for every $x \in \mathbb{R}^2$.

== Coercive operators and forms ==
A self-adjoint operator $A:H\to H,$ where $H$ is a real Hilbert space, is called coercive if there exists a constant $c>0$ such that
$$\langle Ax, x\rangle \ge c\|x\|^2$$
for all $x$ in $H.$

A bilinear form $a:H\times H\to \mathbb R$ is called coercive if there exists a constant $c>0$ such that
$$a(x, x)\ge c\|x\|^2$$
for all $x$ in $H.$

It follows from the Riesz representation theorem that any symmetric (defined as $a(x, y)=a(y, x)$ for all $x, y$ in $H$), continuous ($|a(x, y)|\le k\|x\|\,\|y\|$ for all $x, y$ in $H$ and some constant $k>0$) and coercive bilinear form $a$ has the representation
$$a(x, y)=\langle Ax, y\rangle$$

for some self-adjoint operator $A:H\to H,$ which then turns out to be a coercive operator. Also, given a coercive self-adjoint operator $A,$ the bilinear form $a$ defined as above is coercive.

If $A:H\to H$ is a coercive operator then it is a coercive mapping (in the sense of coercivity of a vector field, where one has to replace the dot product with the more general inner product). Indeed, $\langle Ax, x\rangle \ge C\|x\|$ for big $\|x\|$ (if $\|x\|$ is bounded, then it readily follows); then replacing $x$ by $x\|x\|^{-2}$ we get that $A$ is a coercive operator. One can also show that the converse holds true if $A$ is self-adjoint. The definitions of coercivity for vector fields, operators, and bilinear forms are closely related and compatible.

== Norm-coercive mappings ==
A mapping $f : X \to X'$ between two normed vector spaces $(X, \| \cdot \|)$ and $(X', \| \cdot \|')$ is called norm-coercive if and only if
$$\|f(x)\|' \to + \infty \mbox{ as } \|x\| \to +\infty .$$

More generally, a function $f : X \to X'$ between two topological spaces $X$ and $X'$ is called coercive if for every compact subset $K'$ of $X'$ there exists a compact subset $K$ of $X$ such that
$$f (X \setminus K) \subseteq X' \setminus K'.$$

The composition of a bijective proper map followed by a coercive map is coercive.

== (Extended valued) coercive functions ==
An (extended valued) function $f: \mathbb{R}^n \to \mathbb{R} \cup \{- \infty, + \infty\}$ is called coercive if
$$f(x) \to + \infty \mbox{ as } \| x \| \to + \infty.$$
A real valued coercive function $f:\mathbb{R}^n \to \mathbb{R}$ is, in particular, norm-coercive. However, a norm-coercive function $f:\mathbb{R}^n \to \mathbb{R}$ is not necessarily coercive. For instance, the identity function on $\mathbb{R}$ is norm-coercive but not coercive.

== See also ==
- Radially unbounded functions
- Lax-Milgram lemma
