= Harold Douglas Ursell =

English mathematician (1907–1969)

Harold Douglas Ursell (16 April 1907 – 8 December 1969), known as H. D. Ursell, was an English mathematician who is best known for the Ursell function.

== Life ==
Ursell was born in Warwickshire in 1907, the youngest of six children, and was raised in Birmingham. He was educated at Central Grammar School and King Edward's School in the city, before studying mathematics at Trinity College, Cambridge, where he graduated as a Wrangler with distinction in Part II of the tripos in 1926 at the unusually young age of 19. It was while still an undergraduate that he made his name with the Ursell function, laying the foundations of a cluster expansion theory through the study of imperfect gases. At Cambridge he was the beneficiary of numerous prizes, including the famed Smith's Prize, and in 1929 was elected to a fellowship at Trinity after studying almost period functions under the tutelage of A. S. Besicovitch. He was also a Choate Fellow at Harvard University during the years 1930–31.

Greatly influenced by both Besicovitch and Ludwig Wittgenstein, Ursell left Cambridge while still a young man, following W. P. Milne to take up a position at Leeds University in 1933. There he remained for almost the entirety of his career, rising to the position of Reader in 1948. During his time at Leeds he wrote a number of articles on a variety of topics, becoming noted for his ability to rebut existing theorems using counter-examples; he was, however, perhaps best known for his diligent supervision of undergraduates and postgraduates alike. In 1967, he accepted a professorship at Calgary University in Canada, but died suddenly of a stroke two years later.

Ursell was not related to the German-born fellow Trinity mathematician Fritz Ursell, who taught at Manchester University.

== Sources ==
- Young, L. C. (1970), "Harold Douglas Ursell", Bull. London Math. Soc., 2 (3): 344–346, doi:10.1112/blms/2.3.344
