= Instituto de Investigaciones en Matemáticas Aplicadas y Sistemas =

The Instituto de Investigaciones en Matemáticas Aplicadas y en Sistemas, or IIMAS ("Applied Mathematics and Systems Research Institute") is the research institute of the UNAM in Mexico City which focuses on computer science, applied mathematics, robotics and control engineering.

== History ==
The IIMAS was founded as the Centro de Cálculo Electrónico (Electronic Calculation Center) in 1958 under the auspices of UNAM rector Nabor Carrillo Flores with the purpose of housing and operating the first mainframe acquired by the university. In 1973 the institute acquired its current name and refocused its primary activities from computing services to applied mathematics and computer science research. In the early nineties the IIMAS moved to its current home.

== Staff ==
The IIMAS has an average of 60 researchers aided by 40 technical staff. It is currently headed by Ramsés Humberto Mena Chávez, Ph.D.

== Location and facilities ==
The IIMAS is located in Ciudad Universitaria in Mexico City, nearby the Engineering School and the Science School.

It consists in two buildings, the second one built later on to host the graduate programs and the new library.

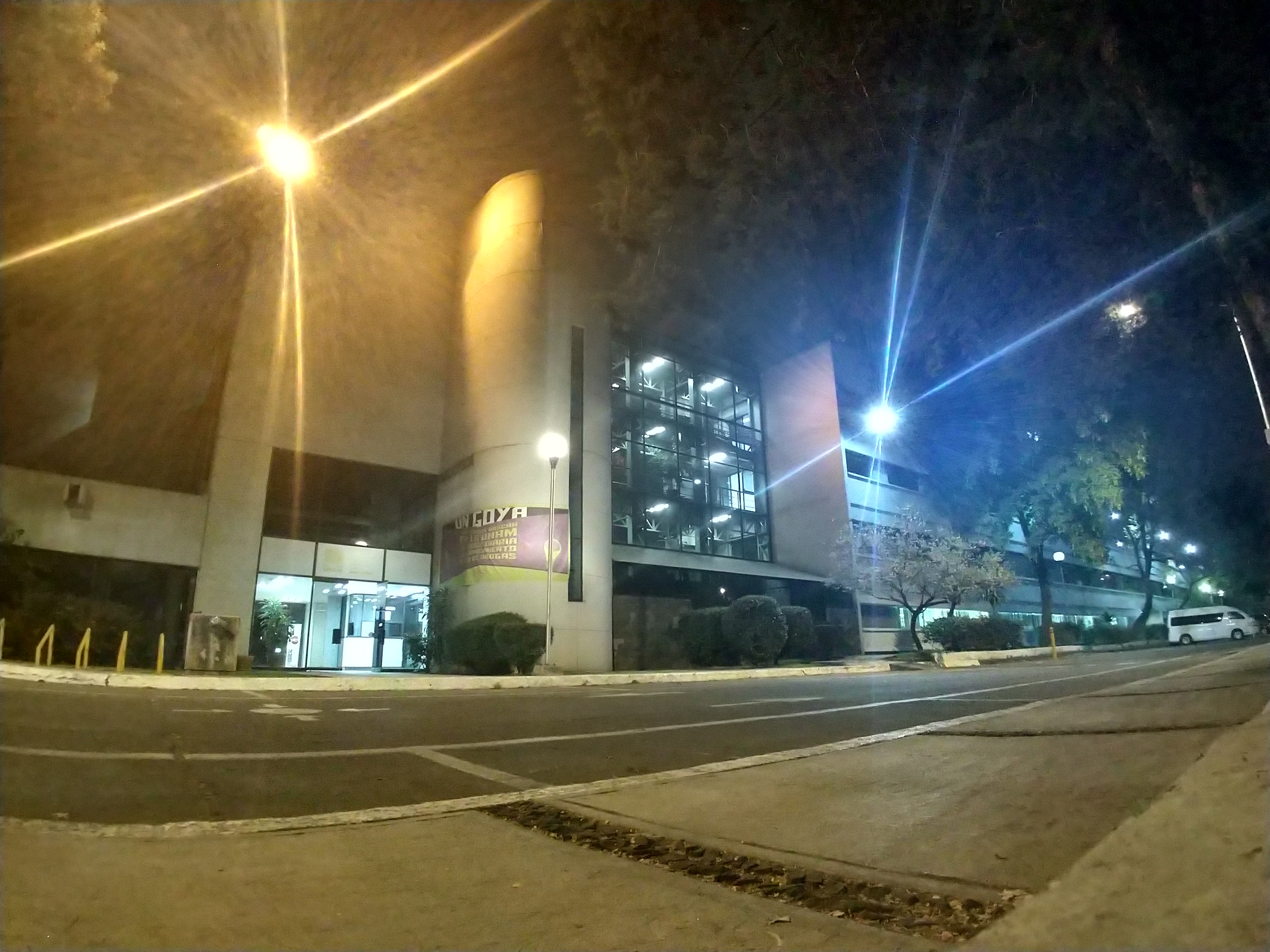
Applied Mathematics and Systems Research Institute (IIMAS)

== Graduate studies ==
The institute currently offers graduate programs in four areas conjointly with the schools of science and engineering, as well as with the Earth Sciences Institute. Graduates students may focus on engineering, computer science, applied mathematics, or Earth sciences.

== Current research ==
Research is divided among six departments:

- Mathematics and mechanics
- Mathematical physics
- Mathematical modeling of social systems
- Probability and statistics
- Computer science
- Computer systems and automation engineering
