= Surjection of Fréchet spaces =

Characterization of surjectivity

The theorem on the surjection of Fréchet spaces is an important theorem, due to Stefan Banach, that characterizes when a continuous linear operator between Fréchet spaces is surjective.

The importance of this theorem is related to the open mapping theorem, which states that a continuous linear surjection between Fréchet spaces is an open map. Often in practice, one knows that they have a continuous linear map between Fréchet spaces and wishes to show that it is surjective in order to use the open mapping theorem to deduce that it is also an open mapping. This theorem may help reach that goal.

== Preliminaries, definitions, and notation ==
Let $L : X \to Y$ be a continuous linear map between topological vector spaces.

The continuous dual space of $X$ is denoted by $X^{\prime}.$

The transpose of $L$ is the map ${}^t L : Y^{\prime} \to X^{\prime}$ defined by $L \left(y^{\prime}\right) := y^{\prime} \circ L.$ If $L : X \to Y$ is surjective then ${}^t L : Y^{\prime} \to X^{\prime}$ will be injective, but the converse is not true in general.

The weak topology on $X$ (resp. $X^{\prime}$) is denoted by $\sigma\left(X, X^{\prime}\right)$ (resp. $\sigma\left(X^{\prime}, X\right)$). The set $X$ endowed with this topology is denoted by $\left(X, \sigma\left(X, X^{\prime}\right)\right).$ The topology $\sigma\left(X, X^{\prime}\right)$ is the weakest topology on $X$ making all linear functionals in $X^{\prime}$ continuous.

If $S \subseteq Y$ then the polar of $S$ in $Y$ is denoted by $S^{\circ}.$

If $p : X \to \R$ is a seminorm on $X$, then $X_p$ will denoted the vector space $X$ endowed with the weakest TVS topology making $p$ continuous. A neighborhood basis of $X_p$ at the origin consists of the sets $\left\{ x \in X : p(x) < r \right\}$ as $r$ ranges over the positive reals. If $p$ is not a norm then $X_p$ is not Hausdorff and $\ker p := \left\{ x \in X : p(x) = 0 \right\}$ is a linear subspace of $X$. If $p$ is continuous then the identity map $\operatorname{Id} : X \to X_p$ is continuous so we may identify the continuous dual space $X_p^{\prime}$ of $X_p$ as a subset of $X^{\prime}$ via the transpose of the identity map ${}^{t} \operatorname{Id} : X_p^{\prime} \to X^{\prime},$ which is injective.

== Surjection of Fréchet spaces ==
Theorem (Banach)—If $L : X \to Y$ is a continuous linear map between two Fréchet spaces, then $L : X \to Y$ is surjective if and only if the following two conditions both hold:

1. ${}^t L : Y^{\prime} \to X^{\prime}$ is injective, and
2. the image of ${}^t L,$ denoted by $\operatorname{Im} {}^t L,$ is weakly closed in $X^{\prime}$ (i.e. closed when $X^{\prime}$ is endowed with the weak-* topology).

== Extensions of the theorem ==
Theorem—If $L : X \to Y$ is a continuous linear map between two Fréchet spaces then the following are equivalent:

1. $L : X \to Y$ is surjective.
2. The following two conditions hold:
  1. ${}^t L : Y^{\prime} \to X^{\prime}$ is injective;
  2. the image $\operatorname{Im} {}^t L$ of ${}^t L$ is weakly closed in $X^{\prime}.$
3. For every continuous seminorm $p$ on $X$ there exists a continuous seminorm $q$ on $Y$ such that the following are true:
  1. for every $y \in Y$ there exists some $x \in X$ such that $q(L(x) - y) = 0$;
  2. for every $y^{\prime} \in Y,$ if ${}^t L\left(y^{\prime}\right) \in X^{\prime}_p$ then $y^{\prime} \in Y^{\prime}_q.$
4. For every continuous seminorm $p$ on $X$ there exists a linear subspace $N$ of $Y$ such that the following are true:
  1. for every $y \in Y$ there exists some $x \in X$ such that $L(x) - y \in N$;
  2. for every $y^{\prime} \in Y^{\prime},$ if ${}^t L \left(y^{\prime}\right) \in X^{\prime}_p$ then $y^{\prime} \in N^{\circ}.$
5. There is a non-increasing sequence $N_1 \supseteq N_2 \supseteq N_3 \supseteq \cdots$ of closed linear subspaces of $Y$ whose intersection is equal to $\{ 0 \}$ and such that the following are true:
  1. for every $y \in Y$ and every positive integer $k$, there exists some $x \in X$ such that $L(x) - y \in N_k$;
  2. for every continuous seminorm $p$ on $X$ there exists an integer $k$ such that any $x \in X$ that satisfies $L(x) \in N_k$ is the limit, in the sense of the seminorm $p$, of a sequence $x_1, x_2, \ldots$ in elements of $X$ such that $L\left(x_i\right) = 0$ for all $i.$

== Lemmas ==
The following lemmas are used to prove the theorems on the surjectivity of Fréchet spaces. They are useful even on their own.

Theorem—Let $X$ be a Fréchet space and $Z$ be a linear subspace of $X^{\prime}.$ The following are equivalent:

1. $Z$ is weakly closed in $X^{\prime}$;
2. There exists a basis $\mathcal{B}$ of neighborhoods of the origin of $X$ such that for every $B \in \mathcal{B},$ $B^{\circ} \cap Z$ is weakly closed;
3. The intersection of $Z$ with every equicontinuous subset $E$ of $X^{\prime}$ is relatively closed in $E$ (where $X^{\prime}$ is given the weak topology induced by $X$ and $E$ is given the subspace topology induced by $X^{\prime}$).

Theorem—On the dual $X^{\prime}$ of a Fréchet space $X$, the topology of uniform convergence on compact convex subsets of $X$ is identical to the topology of uniform convergence on compact subsets of $X$.

Theorem—Let $L : X \to Y$ be a linear map between Hausdorff locally convex TVSs, with $X$ also metrizable. If the map $L : \left(X, \sigma\left(X, X^{\prime}\right)\right) \to \left(Y, \sigma\left(Y, Y^{\prime}\right)\right)$ is continuous then $L : X \to Y$ is continuous (where $X$ and $Y$ carry their original topologies).

== Applications ==
=== Borel's theorem on power series expansions ===
Theorem (E. Borel)—Fix a positive integer $n$. If $P$ is an arbitrary formal power series in $n$ indeterminates with complex coefficients then there exists a $\mathcal{C}^{\infty}$ function $f : \R^n \to \Complex$ whose Taylor expansion at the origin is identical to $P$.

That is, suppose that for every $n$-tuple of non-negative integers $p = \left(p_1, \ldots, p_n\right)$ we are given a complex number $a_p$ (with no restrictions). Then there exists a $\mathcal{C}^{\infty}$ function $f : \R^n \to \Complex$ such that $a_p = \left(\partial / \partial x\right)^p f \bigg\vert_{x = 0}$ for every $n$-tuple $p.$

=== Linear partial differential operators ===
Theorem—Let $D$ be a linear partial differential operator with $\mathcal{C}^{\infty}$ coefficients in an open subset $U \subseteq \R^n.$ The following are equivalent:

1. For every $f \in \mathcal{C}^{\infty}(U)$ there exists some $u \in \mathcal{C}^{\infty}(U)$ such that $D u = f.$
2. $U$ is $D$-convex and $D$ is semiglobally solvable.

$D$ being semiglobally solvable in $U$ means that for every relatively compact open subset $V$ of $U$, the following condition holds:

to every $f \in \mathcal{C}^{\infty}(U)$ there is some $g \in \mathcal{C}^{\infty}(U)$ such that $D g = f$ in $V$.

$U$ being $D$-convex means that for every compact subset $K \subseteq U$ and every integer $n \geq 0,$ there is a compact subset $C_n$ of $U$ such that for every distribution $d$ with compact support in $U$, the following condition holds:

if ${}^{t} D d$ is of order $\leq n$ and if $\operatorname{supp} {}^{t} D d \subseteq K,$ then $\operatorname{supp} d \subseteq C_n.$

== See also ==
- Epimorphism – Surjective homomorphism
- Exponential formula
- Open mapping theorem (functional analysis) – Condition for a linear operator to be open

== Bibliography ==
- Narici, Lawrence; Beckenstein, Edward (2011). Topological Vector Spaces. Pure and applied mathematics (Second ed.). Boca Raton, FL: CRC Press. ISBN 978-1584888666. OCLC 144216834.
- Schaefer, Helmut H.; Wolff, Manfred P. (1999). Topological Vector Spaces. GTM. Vol. 8 (Second ed.). New York, NY: Springer New York Imprint Springer. ISBN 978-1-4612-7155-0. OCLC 840278135.
- Trèves, François (2006) [1967]. Topological Vector Spaces, Distributions and Kernels. Mineola, N.Y.: Dover Publications. ISBN 978-0-486-45352-1. OCLC 853623322.
