= Atiyah–Jones conjecture =

Conjecture about the moduli space of instantons

In mathematics, the Atiyah–Jones conjecture is a conjecture about the homology of the moduli spaces of instantons. The original form of the conjecture considered instantons over a 4-dimensional sphere. It was introduced by Michael Francis Atiyah and John D. S. Jones (1978) and proved by Charles P. Boyer, Jacques C. Hurtubise, and Benjamin M. Mann et al. (1992, 1993). The more general version of the Atiyah–Jones conjecture is a question about the homology of the moduli spaces of instantons on any 4-dimensional real manifold, or on a complex surface. The Atiyah–Jones conjecture has been proved for ruled surfaces by R. J. Milgram and J. Hurtubise, and for rational surfaces by Elizabeth Gasparim. The conjecture remains unproved for other types of 4 manifolds.
