= Ursell function =

In statistical mechanics, an Ursell function or connected correlation function, is a cumulant of a random variable. It can often be obtained by summing over connected Feynman diagrams (the sum over all Feynman diagrams gives the correlation functions).

The Ursell function was named after Harold Ursell, who introduced it in 1927.

== Definition ==
If X is a random variable, the moments s_{n} and cumulants (same as the Ursell functions) u_{n} are functions of X related by the exponential formula:

$$\operatorname{E}(\exp(zX)) = \sum_n s_n \frac{z^n}{n!} = \exp\left(\sum_n u_n \frac{z^n}{n!}\right)$$

(where $\operatorname{E}$ is the expectation).

The Ursell functions for multivariate random variables are defined analogously to the above, and in the same way as multivariate cumulants.

$$u_n\left(X_1, \ldots, X_n\right) = \left.\frac{\partial}{\partial z_1} \cdots \frac{\partial}{\partial z_n}\log \operatorname{E}\left(\exp\sum z_i X_i\right)\right|_{z_i=0}$$

The Ursell functions of a single random variable X are obtained from these by setting X = X_{1} = ⋯ = X_{n}.

The first few are given by
$$\begin{align}
u_1(X_1) ={} &\operatorname{E}(X_1) \\[1ex]
u_2(X_1, X_2) ={} &\operatorname{E}(X_1 X_2) - \operatorname{E}(X_1) \operatorname{E}(X_2) \\[1ex]
u_3(X_1, X_2, X_3) ={} &\operatorname{E}(X_1 X_2 X_3) - \operatorname{E}(X_1) \operatorname{E}(X_2 X_3) - \operatorname{E}(X_2) \operatorname{E}(X_3 X_1) - \operatorname{E}(X_3) \operatorname{E}(X_1 X_2) \\& + 2 \operatorname{E}(X_1) \operatorname{E}(X_2) \operatorname{E}(X_3) \\[1ex]
u_4\left(X_1, X_2, X_3, X_4\right) ={}
&\operatorname{E}(X_1 X_2 X_3 X_4) \\
& - \operatorname{E}(X_1) \operatorname{E}(X_2 X_3 X_4) - \operatorname{E}(X_2) \operatorname{E}(X_1 X_3 X_4) \\
& - \operatorname{E}(X_3) \operatorname{E}(X_1 X_2 X_4) - \operatorname{E}(X_4) \operatorname{E}(X_1 X_2 X_3) \\
& - \operatorname{E}(X_1 X_2) \operatorname{E}(X_3 X_4) - \operatorname{E}(X_1 X_3) \operatorname{E}(X_2 X_4) - \operatorname{E}(X_1 X_4) \operatorname{E}(X_2 X_3) \\
& + 2 \operatorname{E}(X_1 X_2) \operatorname{E}(X_3) \operatorname{E}(X_4) + 2 \operatorname{E}(X_1 X_3) \operatorname{E}(X_2) \operatorname{E}(X_4) \\&+ 2 \operatorname{E}(X_1 X_4) \operatorname{E}(X_2) \operatorname{E}(X_3) + 2 \operatorname{E}(X_2 X_3) \operatorname{E}(X_1) \operatorname{E}(X_4) \\
& + 2 \operatorname{E}(X_2 X_4) \operatorname{E}(X_1) \operatorname{E}(X_3) + 2 \operatorname{E}(X_3 X_4) \operatorname{E}(X_1) \operatorname{E}(X_2) \\
& - 6 \operatorname{E}(X_1) \operatorname{E}(X_2) \operatorname{E}(X_3) \operatorname{E}(X_4)
\end{align}$$

== Characterization ==
Percus (1975) showed that the Ursell functions, considered as multilinear functions of several random variables, are uniquely determined up to a constant by the fact that they vanish whenever the variables X_{i} can be divided into two nonempty independent sets.

== See also ==
- Cumulant
