= Radially unbounded function =

In mathematics, a radially unbounded function is a function $f: \mathbb{R}^n \rightarrow \mathbb{R}$ for which $\|x\| \to \infty \Rightarrow f(x) \to \infty.$

Or equivalently, $\forall c > 0:\exists r > 0 : \forall x \in \mathbb{R}^n: [\Vert x \Vert > r \Rightarrow f(x) > c]$

Such functions are applied in control theory and required in optimization for determination of compact spaces.

Notice that the norm used in the definition can be any norm defined on $\mathbb{R}^n$, and that the behavior of the function along the axes does not necessarily reveal that it is radially unbounded or not; i.e. to be radially unbounded the condition must be verified along any path that results in: $\|x\| \to \infty$

For example, the functions
$$\begin{align}
f_1(x) &= (x_1-x_2)^2 \\
f_2(x) &= (x_1^2+x_2^2)/(1+x_1^2+x_2^2)+(x_1-x_2)^2
\end{align}$$
are not radially unbounded since along the line $x_1 = x_2$, the condition is not verified even though the second function is globally positive definite.
