= Lions–Lax–Milgram theorem =

Functional analysis theorem

In mathematics, the Lions–Lax–Milgram theorem (or simply Lions's theorem) is a result in functional analysis with applications in the study of partial differential equations. It is a generalization of the famous Lax–Milgram theorem, which gives conditions under which a bilinear function can be "inverted" to show the existence and uniqueness of a weak solution to a given boundary value problem. The result is named after the mathematicians Jacques-Louis Lions, Peter Lax and Arthur Milgram.

== Statement of the theorem ==
Let H be a Hilbert space and V a normed space. Let B : H × V → R be a continuous, bilinear function. Then the following are equivalent:

- (coercivity) for some constant c > 0,

$$\inf_{\| v \|_{V} = 1} \sup_{\| h \|_{H} \leq 1} | B(h, v) | \geq c;$$

- (existence of a "weak inverse") for each continuous linear functional f ∈ V^{∗}, there is an element h ∈ H such that

$$B(h, v) = \langle f, v \rangle \mbox{ for all } v \in V.$$

== Related results ==
The Lions–Lax–Milgram theorem can be applied by using the following result, the hypotheses of which are quite common and easy to verify in practical applications:

Suppose that V is continuously embedded in H and that B is V-elliptic, i.e.

- for some c > 0 and all v ∈ V,

$$\| v \|_{H} \leq c \| v \|_{V};$$

- for some α > 0 and all v ∈ V,

$$B(v, v) \geq \alpha \| v \|_{V}^{2}.$$

Then the above coercivity condition (and hence the existence result) holds.

== Importance and applications ==
Lions's generalization is an important one since it allows one to tackle boundary value problems beyond the Hilbert space setting of the original Lax–Milgram theory. To illustrate the power of Lions's theorem, consider the heat equation in n spatial dimensions (x) and one time dimension (t):

$$\partial_{t} u (t, x) = \Delta u (t, x),$$

where Δ denotes the Laplace operator. Two questions arise immediately: on what domain in spacetime is the heat equation to be solved, and what boundary conditions are to be imposed? The first question — the shape of the domain — is the one in which the power of the Lions–Lax–Milgram theorem can be seen. In simple settings, it suffices to consider cylindrical domains: i.e., one fixes a spatial region of interest, Ω, and a maximal time, T ∈(0, +∞], and proceeds to solve the heat equation on the "cylinder"

$$[0, T) \times \Omega \subseteq [0, + \infty) \times \mathbf{R}^{n}.$$

One can then proceed to solve the heat equation using classical Lax–Milgram theory (and/or Galerkin approximations) on each "time slice" {t} × Ω. This is all very well if one only wishes to solve the heat equation on a domain that does not change its shape as a function of time. However, there are many applications for which this is not true: for example, if one wishes to solve the heat equation on the polar ice cap, one must take account of the changing shape of the volume of ice as it evaporates and/or icebergs break away. In other words, one must at least be able to handle domains G in spacetime that do not look the same along each "time slice". (There is also the added complication of domains whose shape changes according to the solution u of the problem itself.) Such domains and boundary conditions are beyond the reach of classical Lax–Milgram theory, but can be attacked using Lions's theorem.

== See also ==
- Babuška–Lax–Milgram theorem
