= Babuška–Lax–Milgram theorem =

Mathematical theorem

In mathematics, the Babuška–Lax–Milgram theorem is a generalization of the famous Lax–Milgram theorem, which gives conditions under which a bilinear form can be "inverted" to show the existence and uniqueness of a weak solution to a given boundary value problem. The result was proved by J. Nečas in 1962, and is a generalization of the famous Lax-Milgram theorem by Peter Lax and Arthur Milgram.

== Background ==
In the modern, functional-analytic approach to the study of partial differential equations, one does not attempt to solve a given partial differential equation directly, but by using the structure of the vector space of possible solutions, e.g. a Sobolev space W^{k,p}. Abstractly, consider two real normed spaces U and V with their continuous dual spaces U^{∗} and V^{∗} respectively. In many applications, U is the space of possible solutions; given some partial differential operator Λ : U → V^{∗} and a specified element f ∈ V^{∗}, the objective is to find a u ∈ U such that

$$\Lambda u = f.$$

However, in the weak formulation, this equation is only required to hold when "tested" against all other possible elements of V. This "testing" is accomplished by means of a bilinear function B : U × V → R which encodes the differential operator Λ; a weak solution to the problem is to find a u ∈ U such that

$$B(u, v) = \langle f, v \rangle \mbox{ for all } v \in V.$$

The achievement of Lax and Milgram in their 1954 result was to specify sufficient conditions for this weak formulation to have a unique solution that depends continuously upon the specified datum f ∈ V^{∗}: it suffices that U = V is a Hilbert space, that B is continuous, and that B is strongly coercive, i.e.

$$| B(u, u) | \geq c \| u \|^{2}$$

for some constant c > 0 and all u ∈ U.

For example, in the solution of the Poisson equation on a bounded, open domain Ω ⊂ R^{n},

$$\begin{cases} - \Delta u(x) = f(x), & x \in \Omega; \\ u(x) = 0, & x \in \partial \Omega; \end{cases}$$

the space U could be taken to be the Sobolev space H_{0}^{1}(Ω) with dual H^{−1}(Ω); the former is a subspace of the L^{p} space V = L^{2}(Ω); the bilinear form B associated to −Δ is the L^{2}(Ω) inner product of the derivatives:

$$B(u, v) = \int_{\Omega} \nabla u(x) \cdot \nabla v(x) \, \mathrm{d} x.$$

Hence, the weak formulation of the Poisson equation, given f ∈ L^{2}(Ω), is to find u_{f} such that

$$\int_{\Omega} \nabla u_{f}(x) \cdot \nabla v(x) \, \mathrm{d} x = \int_{\Omega} f(x) v(x) \, \mathrm{d} x \mbox{ for all } v \in H_{0}^{1} (\Omega).$$

== Statement of the theorem ==
In 1962, J. Nečas provided the following generalization of Lax and Milgram's earlier result, which begins by dispensing with the requirement that U and V be the same space. Let U and V be two real Hilbert spaces and let B : U × V → R be a continuous bilinear functional. Suppose also that B is weakly coercive: for some constant c > 0 and all u ∈ U,

$$\sup_{\| v \| = 1} | B(u, v) | \geq c \| u \|$$

and, for all 0 ≠ v ∈ V,

$$\sup_{\| u \| = 1} | B(u, v) | > 0$$

Then, for all f ∈ V^{∗}, there exists a unique solution u = u_{f} ∈ U to the weak problem

$$B(u_{f}, v) = \langle f, v \rangle \mbox{ for all } v \in V.$$

Moreover, the solution depends continuously on the given data:

$$\| u_{f} \| \leq \frac{1}{c} \| f \|.$$

Nečas' proof extends directly to the situation where $U$ is a Banach space and $V$ a reflexive Banach space.

== See also ==
- Lions–Lax–Milgram theorem
