= Sally Milgrim =

American fashion designer and businesswoman

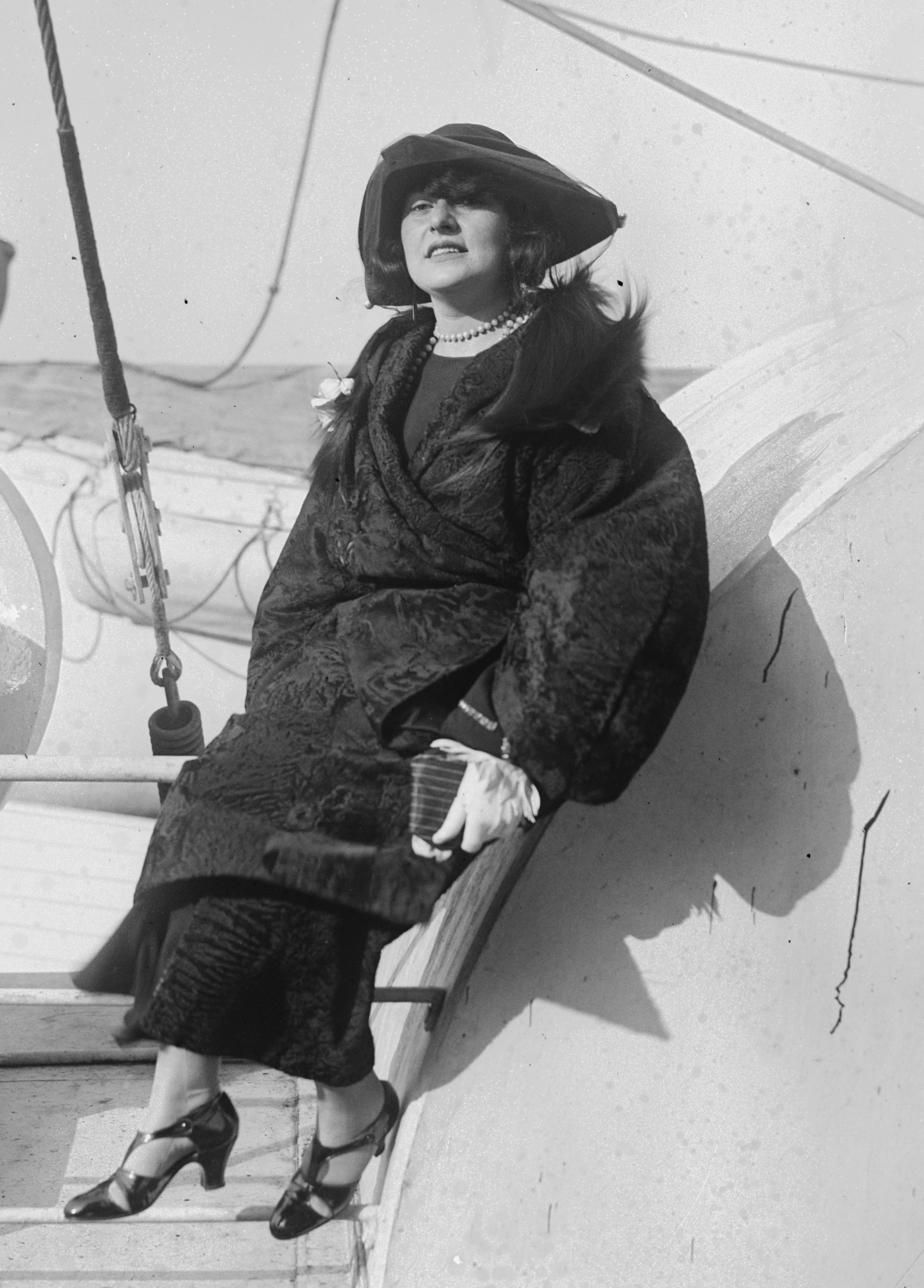
- Milgrim in the 1920s
- Born: April 21, 1898; New York, USA
- Died: June 16, 1994 (aged 96)
- Occupation: Dressmaker
- Spouse: Charles Milgrim (m. 1914)
- Children: Franklin, Richard, Paul

Sally Milgrim (née Knobel; April 21, 1898 – June 16, 1994) was an American businesswoman and fashion designer. She notably designed the dress Eleanor Roosevelt wore to her husband's first inaugural ball.

== Early life and education ==
Milgrim was born as Sally Knobel on April 21, 1898, to immigrant parents Philip and Tillie Knobel. She was married to Charles Milgrim in 1914, who co-operated a family suit business on the Lower East Side of New York City.

== Career ==
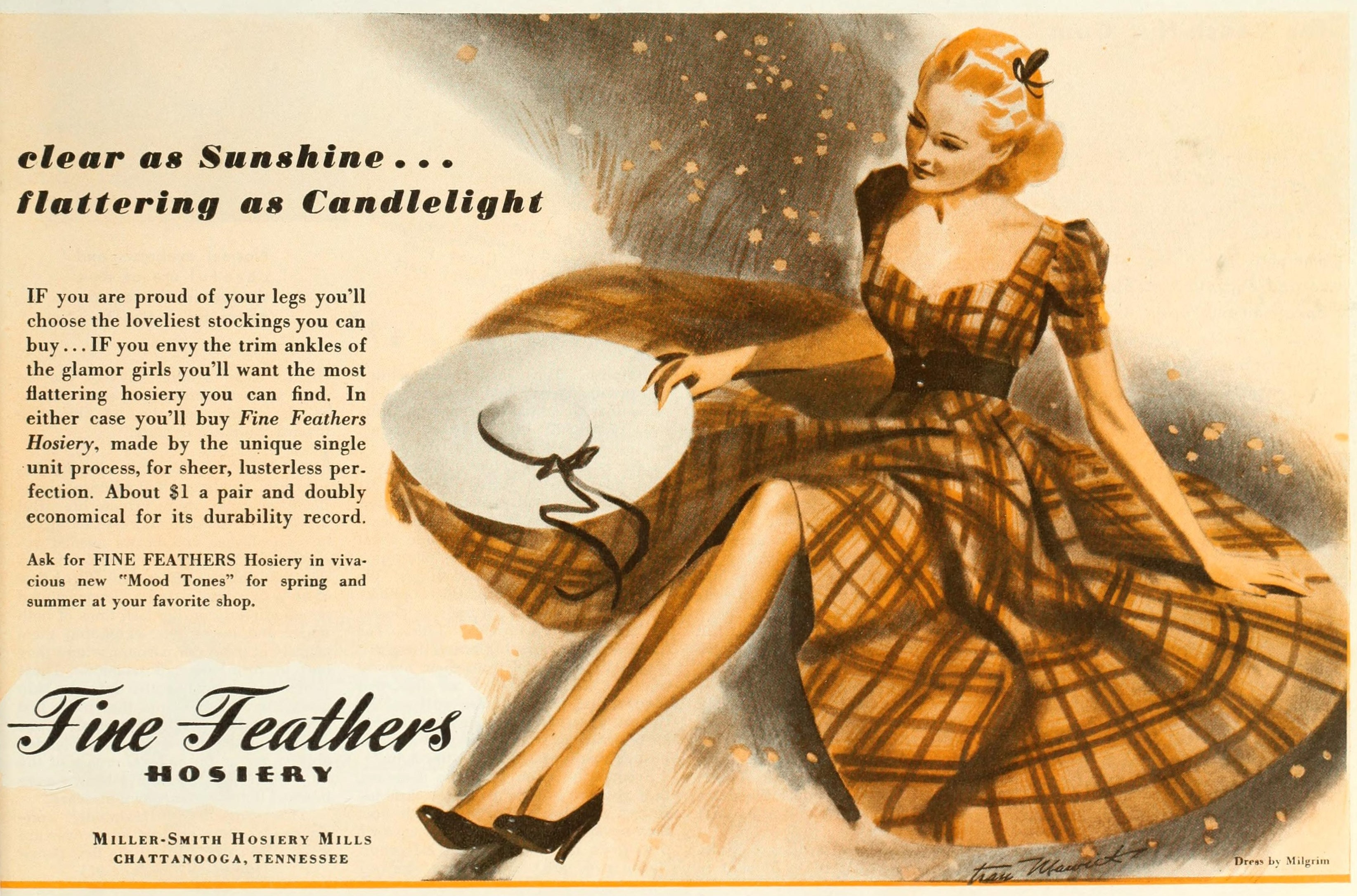
1940 advertisement featuring a dress by Milgrim

At her husband's business, Milgrim began displaying her own dress designs to appeal to the female consumers. By 1922, her dress designs were sold across twenty-nine states and she was recruited to design clothes for Broadway productions. Milgrim eventually opened her own store on 57th Street near Fifth Avenue in 1927. Due to her popularity, Milgrim was forced to move into a larger space on Fifty-Seventh Street to sell her designs. Her building was designed by architect L. H. Friedland and the interior by the Paris Studio of New York.

In 1933, Milgrim was asked to design a dress for Eleanor Roosevelt to wear to her husband's first inaugural ball. The light blue dress would later go on display at the Smithsonian Institution. Milgrim also designed dresses for Marilyn Miller, Ethel Merman, Pearl White, Louise Brooks and Mary Pickford. In March 1936, Milgrim was honored by the New York League of Business and Professional Women for her achievements.

In 1941, Milgrim unveiled a new collection called "Arabesque," as it was inspired by their modest fashion. The clothes in this collection emphasized women's "tent-pole Silhouette," which means she combined many styles into one. She also created a "ready to wear" clothing line labelled "Salymil." Vogue described this label as "fresh young clothes."

== Later life and legacy ==
Milgrim retired from the fashion industry in 1960, and eventually died on June 16, 1994. A collection of her hats is in an exhibition at the Metropolitan Museum of Art.
