= Milgram & Company Ltd. =

Canadian integrated logistics services company

- Type: Private corporation
- Industry: Logistics
- Founded: 1951
- Headquarters: Montreal, Quebec, Canada
- Key people: Jay M. Goldman, President & CEO, Joel S. Milgram, CFO, Laury Gross LLB, CLO, Melanie Bedard, VP Canadian Customs Operations, Nick Imbriglio, VP Sales and International Transport, Mina La Rocca, CSO
- Services: Customs Brokerage, Freight Forwarding, Intermodal Transport
- Number of employees: 300
- Website: http://www.milgram.com

Milgram & Company Ltd. is a Canadian integrated logistics services company specializing in customs brokerage, freight forwarding and North American transport. The company opened in Montreal, Quebec in 1951. In 2011, Milgram expanded into its new headquarters within a fully renovated facility built with green materials at 400 Wellington Street, near the Old Port of Montreal. That year, it was also named one of Canada's 50 best managed companies by the National Post, Deloitte and CIBC. Milgram also ranked number 1 in Les Affaires' "classement des 300 plus grandes PME québecoises" (300 Best Quebec SME's) in 2011 and ranked among the province's top 500 companies of any size. In 2010, the company was the first in Canada to launch a real-time business-to-business tracing service for iPhone and later released it for BlackBerry in 2011. Milgram has offices in Montreal, Toronto and Vancouver, Canada and is supported by a network of agents worldwide.

Milgram is a member of the Intermodal Association of North America (IANA), the Canadian Society of Customs Brokers (CSCB), the Canadian International Freight Forwarding Association (CIFFA) and the Transportation Intermediaries Association (TIA).

Milgram supports the assistance of men, women and children living with HIV/AIDS.

On August 31, 2017, Milgram & Company Ltd. was acquired by transportation and logistics company C. H. Robinson for approximately $62 million CAD (approximately $50 million USD) in cash.
