= Lionel Milgrom =

British chemist and homeopath

Lionel R. Milgrom is a British chemist and homeopath who has been accused of being a proponent of pseudoscience. He is a former faculty member at Imperial College London, and a former senior lecturer in inorganic chemistry at Brunel University. He worked as a chemist with expertise in porphyrins for more than twenty years, after which he trained in homeopathy because he was impressed at how effective homeopathy appeared to be for treating his partner's pneumonia. Milgrom is also the founder of the company PhotoBiotics, a spinoff from Imperial College London, which pioneers a form of light-activated targeted cancer therapy. He has claimed that quantum entanglement explains how homeopathy works, a claim that has been criticized as "patent nonsense" by Chad Orzel. He has criticized those who criticize homeopathy as "new fundamentalists" and accused them of "demean[ing] science".
