= Elbert Frank Cox =

American mathematician (1895–1969)

Elbert Cox
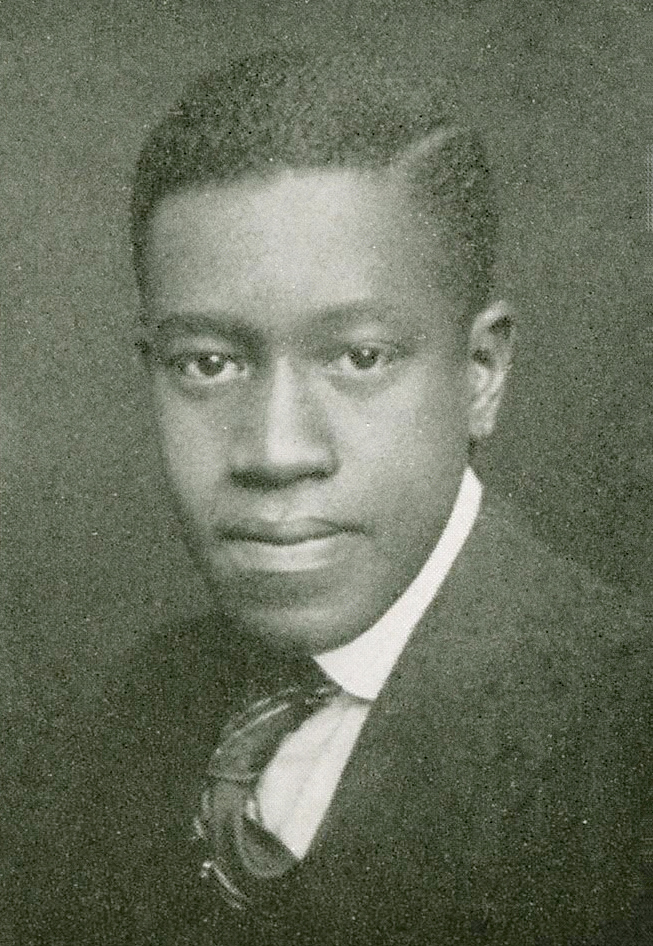
- Cox in 1917
- Born: Elbert Frank Cox; December 5, 1895; Evansville, Indiana, U.S.
- Died: November 28, 1969 (aged 73); Washington, D.C., U.S.
- Education: Indiana University, Bloomington (BA); Cornell University (MA, PhD)
- Spouse: Beulah Kaufman
- Children: 4
- Scientific career
- Fields: Mathematics
- Workplaces: West Virginia State University; Howard University
- Thesis: The polynomial solutions of the difference equation af(x+1) + bf(x) = φ(x) (1925)
- Doctoral advisor: Lloyd Williams

Elbert Frank Cox (5 December 1895 – 28 November 1969) was an American mathematician. He was the first African American to receive a PhD in mathematics, which he earned at Cornell University in 1925.

== Early life ==
Cox was born in Evansville, Indiana to Johnson D. Cox, a Kentucky-born teacher active in the church, and Eugenia Talbot Cox. He grew up with his parents, maternal grandmother and his brother in a racially mixed neighborhood; in 1900, in his block, there were three Black and five white families.

Cox was offered a scholarship to study violin at the Prague Conservatory of Music, but chose to pursue his interest in mathematics instead.

== Education ==
=== Indiana University ===
Cox studied at Indiana University Bloomington. Besides mathematics, Cox also took courses in German, English, Latin, history, hygiene, chemistry, education, philosophy and physics. Cox's brother Avalon went to Indiana University as well. There were three other Black students in his class. He received his bachelor's degree in 1917, at a time when the transcript of every Black student had the word "Colored" printed across it. He received A's on all his exams while at Indiana. During his time at Indiana University he became a member of the historically Black fraternity Kappa Alpha Psi.

=== Between colleges ===
After he graduated in 1917, Cox joined the U.S. Army to fight in France during World War I from 1918 to 1919. After being discharged from the Army, he began working as a high school math tutor.

Cox returned to pursue a career in teaching, as an instructor of mathematics at a high school in Henderson, Kentucky. In the autumn of 1919, he was appointed as a professor in physics, chemistry and biology at Shaw University in Raleigh, North Carolina where he also became chairman of the Department of Natural Sciences. He would continue there until 1922.

=== Cornell University ===
In December 1921, he applied for a graduate scholarship at Cornell University, one of seven American universities with a doctoral program in mathematics. One of his references wrote a positive letter followed by another letter anticipating difficulties for him because he was a "colored man". Cox was approved May 5, 1922, and enrolled in the autumn of the same year.

Important to him at Cornell was a young instructor, William Lloyd Garrison Williams, a co-founder of the Canadian Mathematical Congress who became chair of Cox's "special committee" in March 1923, and was his supervisor. Cox received the Erastus Brooks fellowship in Mathematics ($400 per year) in autumn 1924 and followed Williams to McGill University in Montreal. He moved back to Cornell in the spring semester of 1925, and finished his dissertation, The polynomial solutions of the difference equation af(x+1) + bf(x) = φ(x), in the summer of the same year. On September 26, 1925, he received his Ph.D. He was the first African American to receive a Ph.D. in mathematics, and most likely the first black man in the world to do so. He did not publish a paper until 1934.

While Cox was active at Cornell, the Ku Klux Klan was active in the area.

== West Virginia State College ==
On 16 September 1925, Cox began teaching mathematics and physics at the then all-black, poorly funded West Virginia State College. Professors with a PhD were rare there, and his international connections made him stand out as well. He received a salary of $1,800 (equivalent to $33,000 in 2025). His influence can be seen in the large number of changes in the curriculum between 1925 and 1928. In 1927, he married Beulah Kaufman, the daughter of a former slave. She was a teacher at an elementary school, and worked with Cox's brother Avalon. He and Beulah had met in 1921 and had courted for six years. Their first child, James, was born in 1928. In 1929, Cox joined the faculty of Howard University and moved to Washington, D.C.

== Howard University ==
Cox started to teach at Howard University in September 1930. Despite his credentials, he was outranked by other professors such as William Bauduit and Charles Syphax. Both had published multiple papers; it was only now that Cox published his graduation paper. Williams, his supervisor, tried to pursue recognition for Cox from a university in another country but had difficulties in doing so. Different universities in England and Germany refused to consider his thesis, but the Tohoku Imperial University in Sendai, Japan did recognize it. It was published in the Tôhoku Mathematical Journal in 1934. He was, however, very active in teaching: the university's president, James M. Nabrit, remarked that Cox had directed more Master's Degree students than any other professor at Howard University. His students also performed better than those of other professors, and he was a popular professor. Among his students was his son Elbert Lucien Cox, and William Schieffelin Claytor, the third African-American to get a Ph.D. in mathematics. Cox was promoted to professor in 1947. In 1957, he became head of the Department of Mathematics, a position which he held until 1961. He retired in 1965 at the age of 70, three years before his death. His portrait hangs in the Howard mathematics department's common room.

During World War II, Cox taught engineering science and war management from 1942 to 1944.

During his life, Cox published two articles. He expanded on the work Niels Nörlund had done on Euler polynomials as a solution to a particular difference equation. Cox used generalized Euler polynomials and the generalized Boole summation formula to expand on the Boole summation formula. He also studied a number of specialized polynomials as solutions for certain differential equations. In his other paper, published in 1947, he mathematically compared three systems of grading.

While Cox did not live to see the inauguration of Howard's mathematics PhD, he significantly contributed to its launching, as detailed in his obituary:

"[I]t is believed by many that Cox did much to make it [Howard's mathematics PhD program] possible. Cox helped to build up the department to the point that the Ph.D. program became a practical next step. He gave the department a great deal of credibility; primarily because of this personal prestige as a mathematician, as being the first black to receive a Ph.D. in mathematics, because of the nature and kinds of appointments to the faculty that were made while he chaired the Department, and because of the kinds of students that he attracted to Howard to study mathematics at both the undergraduate and master's levels."

== Honors ==
The National Association of Mathematicians established the Cox–Talbot Address in his honor, which is annually delivered at the NAM's national meetings. The Elbert F. Cox Scholarship Fund, which is used to help black students pursue studies, is also named after him.

Mathematician Talitha Washington championed Cox leading to the November 2006 unveiling of a plaque in Evansville commemorating his pioneering achievement.

== Family ==
Elbert and Beulah Cox had four children.

== Sources and further reading ==
- E.F. Cox (1934). "The polynomial solutions of the difference equation af(x+1) + bf(x) = φ(x)". Tôhoku Mathematical Journal. First series. 39: 327–348.
- E.F. Cox (1947). "On a class of interpolation functions for a system of grading". Journal of Experimental Education. 15 (4): 331–341. doi:10.1080/00220973.1947.11010366.
- "Elbert Cox". University of St. Andrews on Elbert Cox.
- Elbert Cox at the mathematics genealogy project.
- "Elbert Frank Cox". the Mathematical Association of America.
- "Elbert Frank Cox, first Black to earn a PhD in Mathematics". Mathematicians of the African Diaspora.
- "Math department honors Elbert Cox". Cornell University.
- James A. Donaldson, Richard J. Fleming (2000). "Elbert F. Cox: an early pioneer". American Mathematical Monthly. 107 (2). Mathematical Association of America: 105–128. doi:10.2307/2589433. JSTOR 2589433.
- 4 more references for further reading
