= Jacques Hurtubise (painter) =

Canadian painter (1939–2014)

- Born: 1939
- Died: 2014
- Education: École des beaux-arts de Montréal.
- Known for: painter

Jacques Hurtubise (1939–2014) was a Canadian abstract painter, "known for his abstract, brightly coloured acrylic paintings".

== Career ==
Hurtubise was born on 28 February 1939, in Montreal, and studied painting at the École des beaux-arts de Montréal. Already by 1960, at age 21, he had his first major show at the Montreal Museum of Fine Arts. He spent much of the 1960s living in New York City and becoming part of the abstract expressionist scene there. His art at that time combined geometric forms with splashed paint, and he experimented with fluorescent colors and neon light art. In the early 1970s his compositions were based on square forms, but by the late 1970s they shifted to linear patterns that resembled abstract landscapes. His later work featured "deep-black pools, rivers and geometric forms that often mask upside-down maps and text."

His many awards included the grand prize for painting at the 1965 Concours Artistique du Québec, the Victor Martyn Lynch-Staunton Award of the Canada Council for the Arts in 1992, and the Prix Paul-Émile-Borduas from the Québec government in 2000.

Following his daughter`s death in 1980, he sold his Montreal home and travelled. He moved to Nova Scotia in 1983, and died on 27 December 2014, near Inverness, Nova Scotia, on Cape Breton Island.
