= Jacques Hurtubise (mathematician) =

Canadian mathematician

Jacques Claude Hurtubise FRSC (born March 12, 1957) is a Canadian mathematician who works as a professor of mathematics and chair of the mathematics department at McGill University. His research interests include moduli spaces, integrable systems, and Riemann surfaces. Among other contributions, he is known for proving the Atiyah–Jones conjecture (in collaboration with Boyer, Mann, and Milgram).

After undergraduate studies at the Université de Montréal, Hurtubise became a Rhodes Scholar at the University of Oxford for 1978–1981, and earned a DPhil from Oxford in 1982, supervised by Nigel Hitchin, with a dissertation concerning links between algebraic geometry and differential geometry. Following his DPhil, he taught at the Université du Québec à Montréal until 1988, when he moved to McGill. He has also been director of the Centre de Recherches Mathématiques.

Hurtubise won the Coxeter–James Prize of the Canadian Mathematical Society in 1993, and was an AMS Centennial Fellow for 1993–1994. In 2004 he became a fellow of the Royal Society of Canada, and in 2012, he became one of the inaugural fellows of the American Mathematical Society. In 2018 the Canadian Mathematical Society listed him in their inaugural class of fellows.

In 2022 was the recipient of the 2022 David Borwein Distinguished Career Award by the Canadian Mathematical Society (CMS), "for his exceptional, continued, and broad contributions to mathematics".
