= List of members of the National Academy of Engineering (mechanical) =

This list is a subsection of the List of members of the National Academy of Engineering, which includes members and international members of the United States National Academy of Engineering, living and deceased, each affiliated with one of the academy's disciplinary sections. Members are listed under their primary section, and each entry gives the person's name, primary institution, and election year. For deceased members, the year of death is noted.

== Mechanical ==
Name	Institution	Year elected
Hiroyuki Abe	Engineering Academy of Japan	2002
Hadi Abu-Akeel	Brachium Inc.	1997
Jan D. Achenbach (died 2020)	Northwestern University	1982
Allan J. Acosta (died 2020)	California Institute of Technology	1995
Arthur P. Adamson (died 2014)	GE Aircraft Engines	1980
Ronald J. Adrian	Arizona State University	1996
William G. Agnew (died 2020)	General Motors Research Laboratories	1974
Alice M. Agogino	University of California, Berkeley	1997
Dereje Agonafer	The University of Texas at Arlington	2019
Andrew G. Alleyne	University of Minnesota	2023
Marco Amabili	Westlake University	2024
Charles A. Amann (died 2015)	General Motors	1989
Robert O. Ambrose	Texas A&M University	2020
Cristina H. Amon	University of Toronto	2006
Lallit Anand	Massachusetts Institute of Technology	2018
Erik K. Antonsson	California Institute of Technology	2019
Ellen M. Arruda	University of Michigan	2017
Thomas W. Asmus	DaimlerChrysler Corporation	2003
Dennis N. Assanis	University of Delaware	2008
Rupert L. Atkin (died 2014)	TRW Inc.	1975
Nadine N. Aubry	Tufts University	2011
Ivo M. Babuska (died 2023)	The University of Texas at Austin	2005
Donald W. Bahr	GE Aircraft Engines	1991
Rodica A. Baranescu	University of Illinois at Chicago	2001
Saeed David Barbat	Ford Motor Company	2020
Ewa Alice Bardasz	Zual Associates in Lubrication LLC	2015
Mary T. Barra	General Motors	2018
Benton F. Baugh	University of Houston	1999
Howard R. Baum (died 2025)	University of Maryland, College Park	2000
Richard T. Baum (died 2005)	Jaros Baum & Bolles	1983
Zdenek P. Bazant	Northwestern University	1996
Joseph Jefferson Beaman Jr.	The University of Texas at Austin	2013
Horace S. Beattie (died 1993)	International Business Machines Corporation	1976
Christian Laszlo Belady	DigitalBridge	2024
Ted B. Belytschko (died 2014)	Northwestern University	1992
Kathleen Bergeron	Apple Inc.	2022
Arthur E. Bergles (died 2014)	Rensselaer Polytechnic Institute	1992
Donald C. Berkey (died 2019)	General Electric	1979
Irene J. Beyerlein	University of California, Santa Barbara	2024
Paul N. Blumberg	Ford Motor Company	2008
John L. Bogdanoff (died 2003)	Purdue University	1975
David B. Bogy	University of California, Berkeley	1994
Bruno A. Boley (died 2017)	Columbia University	1975
Vladimir V. Bolotin (died 2008)	Russian Academy of Sciences	1996
Gary L. Borman (died 2005)	University of Wisconsin-Madison	1990
Craig Thomas Bowman	Stanford University	2013
Mary Cunningham Boyce	Columbia University	2012
Markus J. Buehler	Massachusetts Institute of Technology	2023
G. Edwin Burks (died 1994)	Caterpillar Inc.	1978
Jonathan Cagan	Carnegie Mellon University	2026
George F. Carrier (died 2002)	Harvard University	1974
Michael M. Carroll (died 2016)	Rice University	1987
Francois J. Castaing (died 2023)	Castaing & Associates	1995
Selim A. Chacour	University of South Florida	2009
Bei Tse Chao (died 2011)	University of Illinois Urbana-Champaign	1981
Dean R. Chapman (died 1995)	Stanford University	1975
Bernard Charlès	Dassault Systèmes	2017
Gang Chen	Massachusetts Institute of Technology	2010
Hudong Chen	Zhejiang University	2023
Jacqueline H. Chen	Sandia National Laboratories	2018
Wei Chen	Northwestern University	2019
Xiangli Chen	McKinsey & Company, Inc.	2017
Herbert S. Cheng (died 2022)	Northwestern University	1987
Harry E. Chesebrough (died 1998)	Chrysler Corporation	1967
Richard M. Christensen (died 2024)	Stanford University	1987
Richard Chao-Fan Chu (died 2012)	International Business Machines Corporation	1987
Walker L. Cisler (died 1994)	Overseas Advisory Associates, Inc.	1964
Rodney J. Clifton	Brown University	1989
Louis F. Coffin Jr. (died 2008)	Rensselaer Polytechnic Institute	1975
James Edward Colgate	Northwestern University	2021
Lance R. Collins	Virginia Tech	2021
Joseph M. Colucci (died 2026)	General Motors Research and Development	2002
William E. Cooper (died 2003)	Teledyne Brown Engineering	1985
Richard W. Couch Jr.	Hypertherm, Inc.	2001
Stephen H. Crandall (died 2013)	Massachusetts Institute of Technology	1977
Robert C Crooke (died 2021)	Global Marine Inc.	1981
Raffaello D'Andrea	ETH Zurich	2020
James W. Dally	University of Maryland, College Park	1984
Ernest L. Daman (died 2024)	Foster Wheeler Development Corporation	1988
Stephen H. Davis (died 2021)	Northwestern University	1994
Robert C. Dean Jr. (died 2023)	Dartmouth College	1977
Vikram S. Deshpande	University of Cambridge	2023
Vijay K. Dhir	University of California, Los Angeles	2006
Diarmuid Downs (died 2014)	Ricardo Consulting Engineers plc.	1987
Robert M. Drake Jr. (died 2020)	Combustion Engineering Inc.	1974
Daniel C. Drucker (died 2001)	University of Florida	1967
Frederick Dryer	University of South Carolina	2021
T. Dixon Dudderar (died 2024)	Bell Laboratories, Lucent Technologies	1992
A. E. Dukler (died 1994)	University of Houston	1977
Elizabeth B. Dussan	Schlumberger-Doll Research	2004
George J. Dvorak (died 2022)	Rensselaer Polytechnic Institute	1995
James Dyson	Dyson Technology	2019
Robert J. Eaton	DaimlerChrysler Corporation	1989
Ernst R.G. Eckert (died 2004)	University of Minnesota	1970
Fredric F. Ehrich (died 2023)	Massachusetts Institute of Technology	1992
Said E. Elghobashi	University of California, Irvine	2014
Martin A. Elliott (died 1988)	Texas Eastern Transmissions Corporation	1976
Howard W. Emmons (died 1998)	Harvard University	1965
Bruce E. Engelmann	Hexagon MSC	2018
Ali Erdemir	Texas A&M University	2019
Arthur Guy Erdman	University of Minnesota	2025
Fazil Erdogan (died 2015)	Lehigh University	1997
Horacio Dante Espinosa	Northwestern University	2020
Harold Etherington (died 1994)	Independent Consultant	1978
Gerard M. Faeth (died 2005)	University of Michigan	1991
Daining Fang (died 2026)	Beijing Institute of Technology	2022
Robert J. Fascetti	Ford Motor Company	2019
James A. Fay (died 2015)	Massachusetts Institute of Technology	1998
Leroy (Mike) M. Fingerson (died 2022)	TSI, Inc	1993
Iain Finnie (died 2009)	University of California, Berkeley	1979
Nancy D. Fitzroy (died 2024)	GE Corporate Research and Development	1995
Norman Andrew Fleck	University of Cambridge	2014
Woodie C. Flowers (died 2019)	Massachusetts Institute of Technology	1994
Patrick F. Flynn (died 2008)	Cummins, Inc.	1995
Richard G. Folsom (died 1996)	Rensselaer Polytechnic Institute	1965
Charles Edwin Freese V	General Motors	2026
Ferdinand Freudenstein (died 2006)	Columbia University	1979
Konstantin V. Frolov (died 2007)	Russian Academy of Sciences	1989
A. Pharo Gagge (died 1993)	Yale University	1979
Huajian Gao	Tsinghua University	2012
Suresh V. Garimella	University of Arizona	2025
Ronald L. Geer (died 2022)	Shell Oil Company	1977
Jacob M. Geist (died 1991)	Geist Tec	1980
H. Joseph Gerber (died 1996)	Gerber Scientific Inc.	1982
Paul Germain (died 2009)	Academy of Sciences of France	1979
Morteza Gharib	California Institute of Technology	2015
Pawan K. Goenka	Mahindra & Mahindra Ltd.	2020
Werner Goldsmith (died 2003)	University of California, Berkeley	1989
Richard J. Goldstein (died 2023)	University of Minnesota	1985
Kenneth E. Goodson	Stanford University	2020
Meredith C. Gourdine (died 1998)	Energy Innovations	1991
Serge Gratch (died 2007)	Kettering University	1983
Denise Gray	LG Energy Solution Michigan, Inc.	2022
Sidney J. Green	Enhanced Production, Inc.	1994
Richard J. Grosh (died 2025)	Ranco Management Corporation	1969
William A. Gross (died 2011)	The University of New Mexico	1996
Selda Gunsel	Shell PLC	2017
Edward E. Hagenlocker	Ford Motor Company	1997
James M. Hait (died 2001)	FMC Corporation	1967
John O. Hallquist	Livermore Software Technology Corporation	2007
Daniel M. Hancock	General Motors	2011
Arthur G. Hansen (died 2010)	Independent Consultant	1976
Ronald K. Hanson	Stanford University	2002
Zvi Hashin (died 2017)	Tel Aviv University	1998
George N. Hatsopoulos (died 2018)	Pharos, LLC	1978
Kenneth E. Haughton	Independent Consultant	1982
Kathleen O'Leary Havelka	Advancion Corporation	2026
William R. Hawthorne (died 2011)	Massachusetts Institute of Technology	1976
J. Karl Hedrick (died 2017)	University of California, Berkeley	2014
Joachim L Heinzl	Technical University of Munich	2007
Martin C. Hemsworth (died 2009)	GE Aircraft Engines	1980
Joseph P. Heremans (died 2025)	The Ohio State University	2013
George Herrmann (died 2007)	Stanford University	1981
Walter Herrmann (died 2000)	Sandia National Laboratories	1993
Hooshang Heshmat	Mohawk Innovative Technology, Inc.	2025
John B. Heywood	Massachusetts Institute of Technology	1998
Hugh David Hibbitt	ABAQUS, Inc.	2013
M. Cynthia Hipwell	Texas A&M University	2016
Philip G. Hodge (died 2014)	Stanford University	1977
Philip John Holmes	Princeton University	2025
Gerhard A. Holzapfel	Graz University of Technology	2025
George M. Homsy (died 2024)	University of Washington	2006
John H. Horlock (died 2015)	Open University	1988
Billy M. Horton (died 2003)	Case Western Reserve University	1979
John R. Howell	The University of Texas at Austin	2005
John A. Hrones (died 2000)	Case Western Reserve University	1975
Davorin D. Hrovat	Ford Motor Company	2006
Jill Marie Hruby	Department of Energy	2022
Chieh-Su Hsu (died 2014)	University of California, Berkeley	1988
Yonggang Huang	Northwestern University	2017
Donald E. Hudson (died 1999)	California Institute of Technology	1973
George J. Huebner Jr. (died 1996)	ERIM International, Inc.	1975
Thomas J.R. Hughes	The University of Texas at Austin	1995
Fazle Hussain	Texas Tech University	2001
John W. Hutchinson	Harvard University	1983
Seiuemon Inaba (died 2020)	FANUC Ltd.	1992
Frank P. Incropera	University of Notre Dame	1996
George R. Irwin (died 1998)	University of Maryland, College Park	1977
Andrew Jackson	University of Pennsylvania	2009
Stephen C. Jacobsen (died 2016)	University of Utah	1990
Mrdjan Jankovic	Southwest Research Institute	2020
David Japikse	Concepts NREC	1998
Burgess H. Jennings (died 1996)	Northwestern University	1977
Marshall G. Jones	GE Global Research	2001
J. Erik Jonsson (died 1995)	Texas Instruments Incorporated	1971
Richard C. Jordan (died 2002)	University of Minnesota	1975
Daniel D. Joseph (died 2011)	University of Minnesota	1990
Eneas D. Kane (died 2013)	Chevron Corporation	1977
Melvin F. Kanninen	MFK Consulting Services	1987
George Em Karniadakis	Brown University	2022
Joseph Katz	Johns Hopkins University	2019
William M. Kays (died 2018)	Stanford University	1977
James C. Keck (died 2010)	Massachusetts Institute of Technology	2002
Leon M. Keer (died 2021)	Northwestern University	1997
Howard H. Kehrl (died 2013)	General Motors	1985
David M. Kelley	Stanford University	2000
John F. Kennedy (died 1991)	The University of Iowa	1973
Paul J. Kern	The Cohen Group	2007
Farhad Khosravi	Imperative Care Inc.	2024
Noboru Kikuchi	Toyota Central R&D Labs, Inc.	2017
John Kim	University of California, Los Angeles	2009
Philip S. Klebanoff (died 1992)	National Institute of Standards and Technology	1981
Stephen J. Kline (died 1997)	Stanford University	1981
Wolfgang G. Knauss	California Institute of Technology	1998
Albert S. Kobayashi	University of Washington	1986
Warner T. Koiter (died 1997)	Delft University of Technology	1977
Ilya Kolmanovsky	University of Michigan	2026
Uwe Richard Kortshagen	University of Minnesota	2026
John Joseph Koszewnik	Achates Power, Inc.	2016
Petros Koumoutsakos	Harvard University	2018
Roger B. Krieger	General Motors Research and Development	2014
R. Vijay Kumar	University of Pennsylvania	2013
Derrick M. Kuzak	Ford Product Development Center	2010
Stelios Kyriakides	The University of Texas at Austin	2007
Bruce M. Lake	TRW Space & Electronics Group	1996
James N. Landis (died 1989)	Bechtel Energy Corporation	1964
Louis Landweber (died 1998)	The University of Iowa	1980
Carl G. Langner	Carl Langner & Associates	1998
Juan C. Lasheras (died 2021)	University of California, San Diego	2012
Evangelos Trifon Laskaris	GE Global Research	2004
Allen Latham Jr. (died 2003)	Haemonetics Corporation	1969
Erastus H. Lee (died 2006)	Stanford University	1975
Robert Lee	Fiat Chrysler Automobiles	2025
Shih-Ying Lee (died 2018)	Massachusetts Institute of Technology	1985
Sidney Leibovich	Cornell University	1993
George Leitmann (died 2025)	University of California, Berkeley	1982
Anthony Leonard	California Institute of Technology	2010
Alexander I. Leontiev (died 2022)	Bauman Moscow State Technical University	2008
Philip Wood Lett Jr. (died 2014)	PWL, Inc.	1984
Yao Tzu Li (died 2011)	Massachusetts Institute of Technology	1987
John H. Lienhard IV	University of Houston	2003
John H. Lienhard V	Massachusetts Institute of Technology	2026
Chwee-Teck Lim	National University of Singapore	2026
Chao-Hsin Lin	The Boeing Company	2022
Tung H. Lin (died 2007)	University of California, Los Angeles	1990
Frederick F. Ling (died 2014)	The University of Texas at Austin	1977
Hans List (died 1996)	AVL Gesellschaft fur Verbrennungskraftmaschinen	1989
Benjamin Y. H. Liu (died 2025)	MSP Corporation	1987
Yaoqi Joe Liu	James Hardie Building Products	2023
Frances E. Lockwood	Valvoline	2021
Detlef Lohse	University of Twente	2017
A. L. London (died 2008)	Stanford University	1979
Richard H. MacNeal (died 2018)	MacNeal-Schwendler Corporation	1996
Ravi Vithal Mahajan	Intel	2022
Giulio Maier	Technical University (Politecnico) of Milan	2003
Arunava Majumdar	Stanford University	2005
Subbaiah Venkata Malladi	Exponent	2025
Frederick J. Mancheski (died 2018)	Echlin Inc.	1991
Robert W. Mann (died 2006)	Massachusetts Institute of Technology	1973
Craig Marks (died 2009)	AlliedSignal Inc.	1985
John L. Mason (died 2019)	Independent Consultant	1988
Tony Maxworthy (died 2013)	University of Southern California	1991
Jyotirmoy Mazumder (died 2021)	University of Michigan	2012
Frank W. McBee Jr. (died 2000)	Tracor, Inc.	1989
Roger L. McCarthy	McCarthy Engineering	2004
Frank A. McClintock (died 2011)	Massachusetts Institute of Technology	1991
David L. McDowell	Georgia Institute of Technology	2026
Gareth H. McKinley	Massachusetts Institute of Technology	2019
Robert M. McMeeking	University of California, Santa Barbara	2005
Charles Meneveau	Johns Hopkins University	2018
David F. Merrion	Merrion Expert Consulting, LLC	2023
Bruno Michel	IBM Research, Zurich	2016
Joachim Milberg	BMW AG	2016
Gordon H. Millar (died 2018)	Independent Consultant	1975
Herbert L. Misch (died 2003)	Ford Motor Company	1976
Parviz Moin	Stanford University	1997
Francis Charles Moon	Cornell University	1996
Franklin K. Moore (died 2016)	Cornell University	1984
Thomas A. Morel	Gamma Technologies, Inc.	2019
Yasuo Mori (died 2012)	Tokyo Institute of Technology	1986
John Christopher Morris	Seagate	2026
C. D. (Dan) Mote Jr.	National Academy of Engineering	1988
Toshio Mura (died 2009)	Northwestern University	1986
William R. Murden Jr. (died 1997)	Murden Marine Ltd.	1979
Jayathi Y. Murthy	Oregon State University	2020
Phillip S. Myers (died 2006)	University of Wisconsin-Madison	1973
Raj Nair	Singer Vehicle Design	2018
Ryoichi Nakagawa (died 1998)	Nissan Motor Company, Ltd.	1990
Alan Needleman	Texas A&M University	2000
Sia Nemat-Nasser (died 2021)	University of California, San Diego	2001
Gerhard Neumann (died 1997)	General Electric	1970
Roberta J. Nichols (died 2005)	Ford Motor Company	1997
Robert E. Nickell (died 2015)	Applied Science and Technology	2007
Jack N. Nielsen (died 1990)	National Aeronautics and Space Administration	1985
Larry T. Nitz	General Motors	2023
Ronald P. Nordgren	Rice University	1989
J. Tinsley Oden (died 2023)	The University of Texas at Austin	1988
Antoni K. Oppenheim (died 2008)	University of California, Berkeley	1978
Michael Ortiz	California Institute of Technology	2013
Simon Ostrach (died 2017)	Case Western Reserve University	1978
Klaus Oswatitsch (died 1993)	Vienna University of Technology	1982
D. Roger J. Owen (died 2020)	Swansea University	2011
David H. Pai (died 2016)	Foster Wheeler Development Corporation	1994
Yih-Ho Michael Pao (died 2013)	University of Houston	2000
Yih-Hsing Pao (died 2013)	Zhejiang University	1985
Panos Y. Papalambros	University of Michigan	2023
Chandrakant Durlabhbhai Patel	Chandrakant Patel Consulting	2018
Glaucio H. Paulino	Princeton University	2021
William S. Pellini (died 1987)	Independent Consultant	1974
Norbert Peters (died 2015)	Rheinisch-Westfalische Technische Hochschule	2002
Donald E. Petersen (died 2024)	Ford Motor Company	1988
Frank E. Pickering (died 2009)	GE Aircraft Engines	1990
Albert P. Pisano	University of California, San Diego	2001
Franz F. Pischinger	FEV GmbH	1997
Robert Plunkett (died 2019)	University of Minnesota	1974
Stephen B. Pope	Cornell University	2010
Ravi Shankar Prasher	Bloom Energy	2024
Ronald F. Probstein (died 2021)	Massachusetts Institute of Technology	1977
Andrea Prosperetti	University of Houston	2012
David Y. H. Pui	University of Minnesota	2016
Madhusudan Raghavan	General Motors Research and Development	2025
Subbiah Ramalingam (died 2019)	University of Minnesota	1998
Guruswami Ravichandran	California Institute of Technology	2015
Junuthula N. Reddy	Texas A&M University	2015
Gamal Refai-Ahmed	Advanced Micro Devices, Inc.	2024
Eric Reissner (died 1996)	University of California, San Diego	1976
William C. Reynolds (died 2004)	Stanford University	1979
Allen F. Rhodes (died 2007)	University of Houston	1985
James R. Rice	Harvard University	1980
Herbert H. Richardson	The Texas A&M University System	1980
James J. Riley	University of Washington	2014
Mate Rimac	Rimac Group	2025
Jerome G. Rivard	Ford Motor Company	1986
Ronald S. Rivlin (died 2005)	Lehigh University	1985
Bernard I. Robertson	DaimlerChrysler Corporation	1999
Kenneth A. Roe (died 1991)	Burns & Roe Enterprises, Inc.	1978
Warren M. Rohsenow (died 2011)	Massachusetts Institute of Technology	1975
Ares J. Rosakis	California Institute of Technology	2011
Donald E. Ross (died 2021)	Jaros Baum & Bolles	1993
M. Taher A Saif	University of Illinois Urbana-Champaign	2024
Dominick J. Sanchini (died 1990)	Rockwell International Corporation	1984
Juan Gabriel Santiago	Stanford University	2026
Owen Saunders (died 1993)	University of London	1979
Stuart B. Savage (died 2024)	McGill University	2000
Robert F. Sawyer (died 2022)	University of California, Berkeley	2008
James Ralph Scapa	Altair Engineering, Inc.	2026
Roger R. Schmidt	International Business Machines Corporation	2005
Galen B. Schubauer (died 1992)	National Institute of Standards and Technology	1980
Robert J. Schultz (died 2026)	General Motors	1992
Venkat Selvamanickam	University of Houston	2026
Yang Shao-Horn	Massachusetts Institute of Technology	2018
Ascher H. Shapiro (died 2004)	Massachusetts Institute of Technology	1974
Pradeep Sharma	University of Houston	2022
Milton C. Shaw (died 2006)	Arizona State University	1968
Shan-Fu Shen (died 2006)	Cornell University	1985
Choon Fong Shih	National University of Singapore	2004
Robert S. Silver (died 1997)	University of Glasgow	1979
Peter G. Simpkins (died 2016)	Syracuse University	1999
Krishna P. Singh	Holtec International	2013
William A. Sirignano	University of California, Irvine	2002
Metin Sitti	Koç University	2024
Alexander H. Slocum Sr.	Massachusetts Institute of Technology	2017
Joseph L. Smith Jr. (died 2013)	Massachusetts Institute of Technology	1984
Leroy H. Smith Jr. (died 2018)	Retired	1988
Megan Joan Smith	shift7	2017
Alexander J. Smits	Princeton University	2011
J. Gary Smyth	General Motors	2023
Saeed Sohrabpour	Sharif University of Technology	2019
Nancy R. Sottos	University of Illinois Urbana-Champaign	2020
Pol D. Spanos	Rice University	2005
Ephraim M. Sparrow (died 2019)	University of Minnesota	1986
Karl J. Springer (died 2025)	Southwest Research Institute	1996
Katepalli R. Sreenivasan	New York University	1999
K. R. Sridhar	Bloom Energy	2016
Charles R. Steele (died 2021)	Stanford University	1995
Z. J. John Stekley (died 2009)	Facioscapulohumeral Society	1981
Robert C. Stempel (died 2011)	Energy Conversion Devices, Inc.	1990
Thomas G. Stephens	General Motors	2007
Beno Sternlicht (died 2012)	Benjosh Management Corporation	1980
Yu Sun	University of Toronto	2026
Zhigang Suo	Harvard University	2008
Pierre Marie Suquet	CNRS-University of Paris VI	2021
Michael Albert Sutton	University of South Carolina	2020
Rodney J. Tabaczynski (died 2025)	Michigan State University	2002
David Tabor (died 2005)	University of Cambridge	1995
Frank E. Talke	University of California, San Diego	1999
Charles E. Taylor (died 2017)	University of Florida	1979
Karen A. Thole	The Pennsylvania State University	2026
Philip A. Thompson (died 2001)	Rensselaer Polytechnic Institute	1989
Chang-Lin Tien (died 2002)	University of California, Berkeley	1976
Frederick H. Todd (died 1992)	U.S. Department of the Navy	1965
Masayoshi Tomizuka	University of California, Berkeley	2022
Shoichiro Toyoda (died 2023)	Toyota Motor Corporation	1994
Hongtei Eric Tseng	Ford Motor Company	2021
Viggo Tvergaard	Technical University of Denmark	2001
Franz-Josef Ulm	Massachusetts Institute of Technology	2022
A. Galip Ulsoy	University of Michigan	2006
Milton D. Van Dyke (died 2010)	Stanford University	1976
Charles M. Vest (died 2013)	National Academy of Engineering	1993
Raymond Viskanta (died 2021)	Purdue University	1987
Wallace R. Wade	Ford Motor Company	2011
John C. Wall	Cummins, Inc.	2010
Kenneth Walters (died 2022)	University of Aberystwyth	1995
Charles W. Wampler II	General Motors	2020
Evelyn N. Wang	Massachusetts Institute of Technology	2025
Q. Jane Wang	Northwestern University	2023
Albertus D. Welliver (died 1994)	The Boeing Company	1987
John J. Wetzel II	General Motors	2000
James H. Whitelaw (died 2006)	Imperial College London	2000
John Raymond Willis	University of Cambridge	2004
Ward O. Winer (died 2025)	Georgia Institute of Technology	1988
David C. Wisler	DBW Enterprises, LLC	2004
Yangsheng Xu	The Chinese University of Hong Kong, Shenzhen	2021
Wei Yang	Zhejiang University	2018
Chia-Shun Yih (died 1997)	University of Michigan	1980
Takeo Yokobori (died 2017)	Teikyo University	1981
Xiang Zhang	The University of Hong Kong	2010
Zhemin Zheng (died 2021)	Institute of Mechanics, Chinese Academy of Science	1993
Ming Zhou	Eastern Institute of Technology, Ningbo	2025
