= Bao (surname) =

Bao or Pao is the pinyin romanization of two Chinese surnames, 包 (pinyin: Bāo) and 鮑/鲍 (pinyin: Bào). It could also be a sinification of the Mongolian surname Borjigin. It is also a Vietnamese surname.

== List of people with surname 包 Bāo ==
- Bao Zheng (999–1062), government official during the Song dynasty and the Chinese cultural icon of justice
- Bao Daoyi, fictional Song dynasty outlaw from the novel Water Margin
- Bao Tianxiao (1876–1973), Chinese writer and translator
- Bao Zunxin (1937–2007), Chinese historian and dissident
- Bao Yingying (born 1983), Chinese sabre fencer
- Bao Bei'er (born 1984), Chinese actor
- Shane Pow (包勋评) (born 1990), Singaporean actor
- Bao Yixin (born 1992), Chinese badminton player

== List of people with surname 鮑/鲍 Bào ==
It is the 62nd name on the Hundred Family Surnames poem.

- Bao Shuya (died 644 BC), official under the Qi during the Spring and Autumn period
- Bao Xin (152–192), general during the Han dynasty
- Bao Xun (died 224), government official during the Han dynasty and later under the Wei during the Three Kingdoms period
- Bao Sanniang, fictional character during the Three Kingdoms period
- Bao Xu, fictional Song dynasty outlaw from the novel Water Margin
- Bao Chao (1828–1886), Qing dynasty general and official
- Yih-Hsing Pao (1930–2013), American engineer
- Bao Tong (1932–2022), former Chinese politician
- Yih-Ho Michael Pao (1934–2013), American engineer
- Bao Guo'an (born 1946), Chinese actor
- Nina Paw (born 1949), Hong Kong actress
- Bao Xishun (born 1951), once recognized as the world's tallest man
- Ellen Pao (born 1970), American lawyer and corporate executive
- Bao Chunlai (born 1983), Chinese badminton player
- Bao Yaxiong (born 1997), Chinese football goalkeeper
