= Chen Shiyi =

Chinese mechanical engineer and physicist

- 陈十一

President of Southern University of Science and Technology
- In office January 2015 – November 2020
- Preceded by: Li Ming (acting)
- Succeeded by: Xue Qikun

Personal details
- Born: 1 October 1956 (age 69) Tiantai County, Zhejiang, China
- Education: Zhejiang University; Peking University
- Scientific career
- Fields: Physics
- Workplaces: Eastern Institute of Technology, Ningbo

Chinese name
- Simplified Chinese: 陈十一
- Traditional Chinese: 陳十一
Transcriptions
Standard Mandarin
- Hanyu Pinyin: Chén Shíyī

Chen Shiyi (Chinese: 陈十一; pinyin: Chén Shíyī; born 1956) is a Chinese mechanical engineer and physicist. He was the President of South University of Science and Technology from 2015 to 2020.

Previously, he was the Alonzo G. Decker Jr. Chair in Engineering and Science, the Department Chair of Mechanical Engineering and Professor at both Department of Applied Mathematics and Statistics, and Department of Physics and Astronomy of Johns Hopkins University. He was also the Dean of the College of Engineering and the Director of the Center for Computational Science & Engineering, Peking University.

== Career ==
Chen studied mechanics at Zhejiang University (B.Sc.) from January 1978 to January 1982. He did his postgraduate study (M.Sc., PhD) at Peking University.

He was a post-doctoral fellow at Los Alamos National Laboratory USA from June 1987 to February 1990. From February 1990 to December 1990, he was a research scientist at the Bartol Research Institute, University of Delaware. From May 1990 till December 1993, he was a visiting faculty in the Department of Mathematics, Colorado State University. From December 1990 - November 1992, he was an Oppenheimer Fellow at the Los Alamos National Laboratory. November 1992 - September 1994, he was a research staff and group leader in the same lab. September 1994 - January 2000, he was a research staff member at the IBM Research Division. Then he started his career at the Johns Hopkins University. July 1997 - January 2000, he was also the deputy director of the Center for Nonlinear Studies, Los Alamos National Laboratory. From 2005 to 2011, he became Dean of Engineering at Peking University, China. From 2013 to 2015, he became VP for Research at Peking University. In 2015, he joined SUSTech, China, as university President.

Chen conducted research in lattice gas methods in which he created important analysis approaches and led engineering applications. He also made contributions to high-performance computing. He did fundamental studies in the theory of turbulence. For these reasons, he was elected as a fellow of American Physical Society (1995) and Institute of Physics (2004).

He was elected to member of Chinese Academy of Sciences in 2013. In 2018, Chen became a laureate of the Asian Scientist 100 by the Asian Scientist.

Educational offices
New title	Dean of the School of Engineering of Peking University; 2005–2013	Succeeded by Zhang Dongxiao
Preceded by Wang Enge	Dean of the Graduate School of Peking University; 2011–2015	Succeeded by Gao Song
Preceded by Hai Wen	Dean of the Peking University Shenzhen Graduate School; 2013–2015	Succeeded by Wu Yundong
Preceded by Li Ming (acting)	President of Southern University of Science and Technology; 2015–2020	Succeeded by Xue Qikun
