= Haizhou Li =

Professor in China, Singapore and Germany

Haizhou Li is the X.Q. Deng Presidential Chair Professor in the School of Data Science, The Chinese University of Hong Kong, Shenzhen, China. He is also an adjunct professor at the National University of Singapore, Singapore and a Bremen Excellence Chair Professor at the University of Bremen, Germany. He was named Fellow of the Institute of Electrical and Electronics Engineers (IEEE) in 2014 for leadership in multilingual speaker and language recognition. He was the Editor-in-Chief of IEEE/ACM Transactions on Audio, Speech and Language Processing from 2015 to 2018. He received the President's Technology Award Singapore in 2013.
