= Gao Song =

Gao Song is the name of:

- Gao Song (figure skater) (born 1981), Chinese male figure skater
- Gao Song (basketball) (born 1992), Chinese women's basketball player
- Gao Song (professor) (born 1964), President of South China University of Technology
