= Philip Myers =

Philip Myers may refer to:

- Philip Myers (musician) (born 1949), American French horn player
- Sir Philip Myers (police officer) (1931–2014), British police officer
- Philip van Ness Myers (1846–1937), American historian
- Philip Myers (biologist), American mammalogist, namesake of Philip Myers's akodont

== See also ==
- Phillip G. Myers (1839–1881), Australian politician and auctioneer in New South Wales
- Phillip S. Myers (1916–2006), American mechanical engineer
- Philippe Myers (born 1997), Canadian ice hockey player
