= John D. Eshelby =

British micromechanics scientist (1916-1981)

Professor John D. Eshelby FRS
- Born: John Douglas Eshelby; 21 December 1916; Puddington, Cheshire
- Died: 10 December 1981 (aged 64)
- Other name: Jock
- Education: University of Bristol
- Known for: Eshelby's inclusion
- Scientific career
- Fields: Micromechanics of Materials
- Workplaces: University of Bristol; Royal Air Force; University of Illinois Urbana-Champaign; University of Birmingham; Cavendish Laboratory; University of Sheffield
- Thesis: Stationary and moving dislocation (1950)
- Doctoral advisor: Nevill Mott

John Douglas Eshelby FRS (21 December 1916 – 10 December 1981) was a British scientist in micromechanics. He made significant contributions to the fields of defect mechanics and micromechanics of inhomogeneous solids for fifty years, including important aspects of the controlling mechanisms of plastic deformation and fracture.

== Early life and education ==
Eshelby was born at Puddington, Cheshire, the son of Captain Alan Douglas Eshelby and Phoebe Mason Hutchinson. He was educated at St Cyprian's School, Eastbourne and was due to go to Charterhouse School but developed rheumatic fever and received his secondary education privately at home. At about this time the family moved to Manor House at Farrington Gurney, Somerset where his tutors were the village schoolmaster and a local clergyman. He relied extensively on self-instruction and obtained a place in the Physics Department of Bristol University and was awarded a first class honours in physics in 1937. He then worked in a research laboratory under H W B Skinner and W Sucksmith on magnetism and the soft X-ray spectra of solids.

== Research and career ==
In World War II Eshelby began working for the Admiralty on the degaussing of ships, but on 4 May 1940 he joined the Technical Branch of the Royal Air Force. His work from February 1941 to June 1942 was for the Coastal Command Development Unit conducting performance trials of air-to-surface-vessel radar and other operational devices in all types of aircraft. He was then involved in radar work, from August 1942 to February 1943 with 76 signals wing and from February 1943 to September 1944 at the radar establishment at Malvern. He was then transferred to disarmament work and then to the Air Historical Branch in September 1945. He left the RAF as a squadron leader on 4 October 1946.

After the war Eshelby returned to Bristol University to study for a PhD and taught himself the theory of elasticity for his thesis on "Stationary and moving dislocations". He obtained his PhD in 1950 under Nevill Mott. In 1951 he moved to the University of Illinois Urbana-Champaign as a Research Associate, where he stayed until 1953 when he was appointed a lecturer at the University of Birmingham, where he taught from 1953 to 1964 at the Department of Metallurgy. During this time, he worked on point defects and dislocations, developing the method of 'transformation strains' and studying the Eshelby inclusion problems for the first time, as well as the study of forces on elastic singularities.

In 1964 he moved to the Cavendish Laboratory at Cambridge University at the behest of Neville Mott, and was a Fellow of Churchill College from 1965 to 1966. He was then appointed Reader in the Faculty of Materials (Theory of Materials) at the University of Sheffield, where he became Professor in 1971.

== Personal life and death ==
Eshelby was clear and amusing as a lecturer, and prepared his lectures with great care, but was not keen on doing experimental work. He was well versed in Sanskrit (among other classical languages) and was an avid second-hand book buyer.

Eshelby died on 10 December 1981.

== Awards and honours ==
Eshelby was elected a Fellow of the Royal Society in March 1974. He was awarded the Timoshenko Medal in 1977.

In 2012, the Eshelby Mechanics Award for Young Faculty and the Eshelby Memorial Bursary was founded in his memory. was launched to commemorate the memory of Eshelby. The award is given annually to rapidly emerging junior faculty who exemplify the creative use and development of mechanics, and awardees are formally recognised at the annual Applied Mechanics Division Banquet at the American Society of Mechanical Engineers' International Mechanical Engineering Congress and Exposition (ASME-IMECE) meeting.

== Legacy ==
Eshelby work helped shape the fields of defect mechanics and micromechanics of inhomogeneous solids for fifty years, including the controlling mechanisms of plastic deformation and fracture.The scientific phenomenon called Eshelby's inclusion is named after this scientist, and points at an ellipsoidal subdomain in an infinite homogeneous body, subjected to a uniform transformation strain.

== Selected publications ==
- A Tentative Theory of Metallic Whisker Growth University of Illinois Urbana-Champaign, Received 4 June 1953 The American Physical Society
- Eshelby, J. D. (1951). "The Force on an Elastic Singularity". Philosophical Transactions of the Royal Society A: Mathematical, Physical and Engineering Sciences. 244 (877): 87–112. Bibcode:1951RSPTA.244...87E. doi:10.1098/rsta.1951.0016. S2CID 14703976.
- Eshelby, J. D. (1957). "The Determination of the Elastic Field of an Ellipsoidal Inclusion, and Related Problems" (PDF). Proceedings of the Royal Society of London. 241 (1226): 376–396. Bibcode:1957RSPSA.241..376E. doi:10.1098/rspa.1957.0133. S2CID 122550488.
- Eshelby, J. D. (1959). "The Elastic Field Outside an Ellipsoidal Inclusion". Proceedings of the Royal Society of London. 252 (1271): 561–569. Bibcode:1959RSPSA.252..561E. doi:10.1098/rspa.1959.0173. S2CID 119853168.
- Collected Works of J. D. Eshelby, Mechanics of Defects and Inhomogeneities, Springer (2006), Xanthippi Markenscoff and Anurag Gupta (Eds.) ISBN 1-4020-4416-X
- J. D. Eshelby, "The continuum theory of lattice defects," in: F. Seitz and D. Turnbull (eds.), Progress in Solid State Physics, Vol. 3, Academic Press, New York (1956), pp. 79–303.
