= Xiao Wei Sun =

Chinese engineer and academic

- Occupations: entrepreneur and Academic

Academic background
- Education: B.S., Optoelectronics; M.S., Optical Engineering; Ph.D., Optical Engineering; Ph.D., Electrical and Electronic Engineering
- Alma mater: Tianjin University; Hong Kong University of Science and Technology

Academic work
- Institutions: Southern University of Science and Technology

Xiao Wei Sun (Chinese:孙小卫) is an entrepreneur and academic. He founded Planck Innovation in October 2016 and later co-founded Moxwell Tech in March 2025. As the Chief Scientist of both companies, he takes care of the future technology development. In addition to his entrepreneurial activities, he has a strong academic background. He serving as a Distinguished Professor in the Department of Electrical and Electronic Engineering as well as the Executive Dean of the Institute of Nanoscience and Applications at Southern University of Science and Technology.

With over 45000 citations and an h-index of 106, Sun has authored over 700 publications. His work has been published in leading academic journals, including Applied Physics Letters, Journal of Applied Physics, Advanced Materials, Nano Letters, Physical Review Letters, Nature Nanotechnology, Nature Communications etc. Moreover, he is the recipient of the SPIE DCS 2024 Fumio Okano Best Paper Prize, and the 2023 SID Slottow-Owaki Prize.

Sun is an Honorary Doctorate from Belarusian State University of Informatics and Radioelectronics. He is a Foreign Member of the Russian Academy of Sciences, a Fellow of the Institute of Electrical and Electronics Engineers (IEEE), the Optica (formerly Optical Society of America (OSA)), the International Society for Optics and Photonics (SPIE), the Society for Information Display (SID, the first mainland Chinese fellow), and the Institute of Physics (IoP) in UK. He has also been honored as a Distinguished Lecturer by the Institute of Electrical and Electronics Engineers (IEEE). He established the Society for Energy Photonics in Singapore, a non-profitable organization promoting photonic solutions to combat global warming and climate change. He also co-founded the Singapore-China Association for Advancement of Science and Technology (SCAAST), serving as the founding Vice Chairman. Additionally, he directed the Key Laboratory of Energy Conversion and Storage Technology under the Ministry of Education and the Guangdong Provincial Key Laboratory of Quantum Dot Advanced Display and Lighting.

== Education ==
Sun earned a B.S. in Optoelectronics from Tianjin University in 1990, followed by an M.S. in Optical Engineering in 1992 from the same institution. He obtained his Ph.D. in Optical Engineering from Tianjin University in 1994 and a second Ph.D. in Electrical and Electronic Engineering from the Hong Kong University of Science and Technology in 1998.

== Career ==
Sun began his academic career at Nanyang Technological University, where he served as an Assistant Professor from 1998 to 2005, followed by a tenured position as an Associate Professor from 2005 to 2011. He was appointed as a Full Professor in the School of Electrical and Electronics Engineering from 2011 to 2015. Simultaneously, he was invited to establish the Department of Electrical and Electronic Engineering at Southern University of Science and Technology (established in 2012 by Shenzhen Government). In 2015, he left Singapore and joined the Southern University of Science and Technology as a Distinguished Professor, serving as the acting Dean of the new College of Engineering for a year, and the founding head of the Department of Electrical and Electronic Engineering. He continued in that role till 2020. Between 2020 and 2021, he served as Acting Director at the Technology Transfer Office. Since 2022, he has served as the Executive Dean of the Institute of Nanoscience and Applications at Southern University of Science and Technology.

Since returning to China, Sun has led multiple national, provincial, and municipal research projects on the industrial applications of quantum dots and 3D displays. He founded the Guangdong Microdisplay Industry Alliance, organized 16 international conferences, and established two startups in the display industry. One startup, Shenzhen Planck Innovations Pte Ltd, focuses on quantum dot films, while the other, Shenzhen Sitan Technologies Pte Ltd, specializes in micro-LED technologies. Sun also established the Society for Energy Photonics and co-founded the Singapore-China Association for Science and Technology Promotion.

== Awards and honors ==
Sun has received several notable awards and honors throughout his career, reflecting recognition of his contributions to science and technology. In 2009, he was named a Fellow of the Institute of Physics and received the NTU Technology and Innovation Award. The following year, in 2010, he was elected as a Fellow of SPIE, and in 2011, he was further recognized as a Fellow of SID. His achievements continued in 2013 when he was honored with the Jacques Beaulieu Distinguished Research Chair Award by the National Institute for Scientific Research and was also inducted as an Academician of the Asia-Pacific Academy of Materials. Subsequently, in 2016, he was elected a Fellow of Optica (formerly OSA), followed by his selection as an IEEE Distinguished Lecturer in 2018. In 2021, his work was further acknowledged with an Honorary Doctorate from the Belarusian State University of Informatics and Radioelectronics (BSUIR). More recently, in 2023, he received the SID Slottow-Owaki Prize and in 2024, he was awarded the SPIE DCS Fumio Okano Best 3D Paper Prize. Most recently in 2024, he was elected as a fellow of IEEE with citation of "For contributions to optoelectronic materials and devices".
