= David Pui =

Chinese-American mechanical engineer (born 1949)

David You Hong Pui (Chinese: 裴有康; born 27 May 1949) is a Chinese-American mechanical engineer and professor.

== Education and career ==
Pui, a native of Shanghai, earned his bachelor's of science (1970), master's of science (1973), and doctor of philosophy degrees (1975), all in mechanical engineering, from the University of Minnesota, where he later taught as Regents Professor and LM Fingerson/TSI Chair in Mechanical Engineering. Pui has held a Presidential Chair Professorship at the Chinese University of Hong Kong, Shenzhen.

In 2016, Pui was elected a member of the United States National Academy of Engineering, "[f]or contributions to aerosol and nanoparticle science and engineering for air pollution control."

=== World's largest air purification tower ===
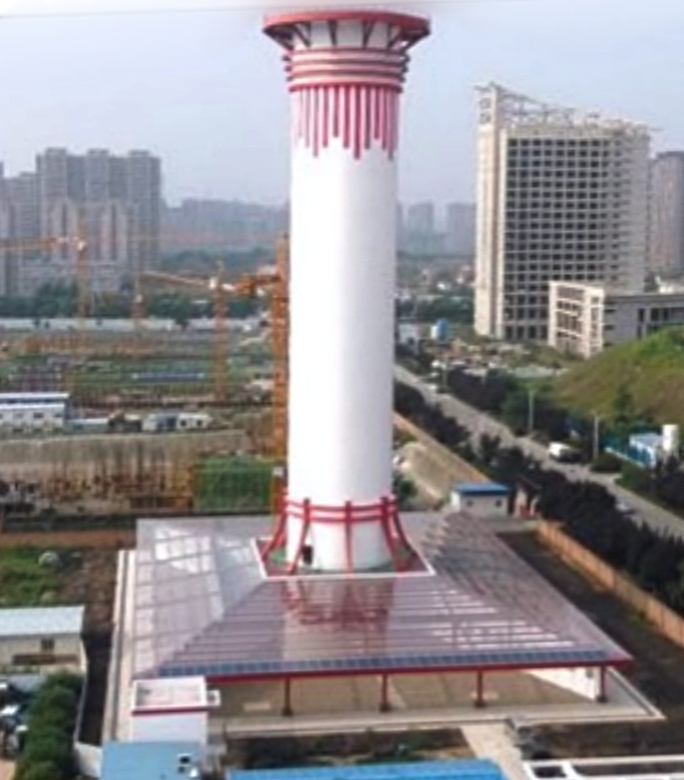
World's largest air purification tower in Xi'an, also called the first generation SALSCS (Solar-assisted Large Scale Cleaning System)

“Pui and his colleagues successfully installed their first air purification tower in China in 2016. As the world's first large-scale air filtration project, the tower relies on solar power to draw in polluted air ... Pui developed the technology in 2014 with the help of Ph.D. student Qingfeng Cao.”

=== Air cleaning towers in India ===
In 2023, Pui collaborated with researchers in India to develop large-scale air purification towers designed to reduce urban smog using solar-assisted filtration technology.
