= Diligentia College =

Higher education institution in China

- Motto: 修己以善群，力行致良知
- Established: 2016
- Parent institution: The Chinese University of Hong Kong, Shenzhen
- Location: Shenzhen, Guangdong, China
- Website: diligentia.cuhk.edu.cn

The Diligentia College is a constituent college of The Chinese University of Hong Kong, Shenzhen. The Diligentia College was established in 2016 with an endowment from the Genzon Public Welfare and Charity Foundation.

The Diligentia College is located on the upper campus of The Chinese University of Hong Kong, Shenzhen.

== History ==
In 2016, the Genzon Public Welfare and Charity Foundation provided an endowment to The Chinese University of Hong Kong, Shenzhen to establish Diligentia College. The inauguration ceremony was held on October 14, 2016, and Prof. Gu Yang served as the dean of the college.

In March 2023, the Diligentia College established a sister college relationship with the United College of CUHK.

On November 15, 2023, Diligentia College hosted the C5 Youth Student Leader Summit, which had students from Tsinghua University, Fudan University, Shanghai Jiaotong University, Chongqing University, and the University of Macau.

== Sister colleges ==
Sister colleges include:

- The United College of Hong Kong
- Lee Woo Sing College
