= Xanthippi Markenscoff =

Greek-American mechanical engineer

Xanthippi Markenscoff is a Greek-American mechanical engineer specializing in the dynamics of defects and dislocations in materials, including Eshelby's inclusion; other topics in her research have included grasping and fixturing, and the relation between strain and natural frequency. She is a distinguished professor emerita in the Department of Mechanical & Aerospace Engineering at the University of California, San Diego.

== Education and career ==
After earning a diploma in civil engineering at the National Technical University of Athens, Markenscoff completed her Ph.D. at Princeton University.

She was an assistant professor at Virginia Tech from 1974 to 1976 and then, after temporary positions at the Massachusetts Institute of Technology, Brown University, and Alcoa, moved to Carnegie Mellon University in 1978 and again to the University of California, Santa Barbara in 1981, where she was promoted to full professor in 1987. In 1988 she took her present position at the University of California, San Diego. She became a distinguished professor there in 2013.

== Recognition ==
Saint Petersburg State University in Russia gave Markenscoff an honorary doctorate in 1997. She is a Fellow of the American Society of Mechanical Engineers, and was named a Fellow of the Society of Engineering Science in 2002.
