= Micromechanics =

Analysis of composite materials

Micromechanics (or, more precisely, micromechanics of materials) is the analysis of heterogeneous materials including of composite, and anisotropic and orthotropic materials on the level of the individual constituents that constitute them and their interactions.

== Aims of micromechanics of materials ==
Heterogeneous materials, such as composites, solid foams, polycrystals, or bone, consist of clearly distinguishable constituents (or phases) that show different mechanical and physical material properties. While the constituents can often be modeled as having isotropic behaviour, the microstructure characteristics (shape, orientation, varying volume fraction, ..) of heterogeneous materials often leads to an anisotropic behaviour.

Anisotropic material models are available for linear elasticity. In the nonlinear regime, the modeling is often restricted to orthotropic material models which do not capture the physics for all heterogeneous materials. An important goal of micromechanics is predicting the anisotropic response of the heterogeneous material on the basis of the geometries and properties of the individual phases, a task known as homogenization.

Micromechanics allows predicting multi-axial responses that are often difficult to measure experimentally. A typical example is the out-of-plane properties for unidirectional composites.

The main advantage of micromechanics is to perform virtual testing in order to reduce the cost of an experimental campaign. Indeed, an experimental campaign of heterogeneous material is often expensive and involves a larger number of permutations: constituent material combinations; fiber and particle volume fractions; fiber and particle arrangements; and processing histories). Once the constituents properties are known, all these permutations can be simulated through virtual testing using micromechanics.

There are several ways to obtain the material properties of each constituent: by identifying the behaviour based on molecular dynamics simulation results; by identifying the behaviour through an experimental campaign on each constituent; by reverse engineering the properties through a reduced experimental campaign on the heterogeneous material. The latter option is typically used since some constituents are difficult to test, there are always some uncertainties on the real microstructure and it allows to take into account the weakness of the micromechanics approach into the constituents material properties. The obtained material models need to be validated through comparison with a different set of experimental data than the one use for the reverse engineering.

== Generality on micromechanics ==
A key point of micromechanics of materials is the localization, which aims at evaluating the local (stress and strain) fields in the phases for given macroscopic load states, phase properties, and phase geometries. Such knowledge is especially important in understanding and describing material damage and failure.

Because most heterogeneous materials show a statistical rather than a deterministic arrangement of the constituents, the methods of micromechanics are typically based on the concept of the representative volume element (RVE). An RVE is understood to be a sub-volume of an inhomogeneous medium that is of sufficient size for providing all geometrical information necessary for obtaining an appropriate homogenized behavior.

Most methods in micromechanics of materials are based on continuum mechanics rather than on atomistic approaches such as nanomechanics or molecular dynamics. In addition to the mechanical responses of inhomogeneous materials, their thermal conduction behavior and related problems can be studied with analytical and numerical continuum methods. All these approaches may be subsumed under the name of "continuum micromechanics".

== Analytical methods of continuum micromechanics ==
Voigt (1887) - Strains uniform in composite, rule of mixtures for stiffness components.

Reuss (1929) - Stresses uniform in composite, rule of mixtures for compliance components.

Strength of Materials (SOM) - Longitudinally: strains constant in composite, stresses volume-additive. Transversely: stresses constant in composite, strains volume-additive.

Vanishing Fiber Diameter (VFD) - Combination of average stress and strain assumptions that can be visualized as each fiber having a vanishing diameter yet finite volume.

Composite Cylinder Assemblage (CCA) - Composite composed of cylindrical fibers surrounded by cylindrical matrix layer, cylindrical elasticity solution. Analogous method for macroscopically isotropic inhomogeneous materials: Composite Sphere Assemblage (CSA)

Hashin-Shtrikman Bounds - Provide bounds on the elastic moduli and tensors of transversally isotropic composites (reinforced, e.g., by aligned continuous fibers) and isotropic composites (reinforced, e.g., by randomly positioned particles).

Self-Consistent Schemes - Effective medium approximations based on Eshelby's elasticity solution for an inhomogeneity embedded in an infinite medium. Uses the material properties of the composite for the infinite medium.

Mori-Tanaka Method - Effective field approximation based on Eshelby's elasticity solution for inhomogeneity in infinite medium. As is typical for mean field micromechanics models, fourth-order concentration tensors relate the average stress or average strain tensors in inhomogeneities and matrix to the average macroscopic stress or strain tensor, respectively; inhomogeneity "feels" effective matrix fields, accounting for phase interaction effects in a collective, approximate way.

== Numerical approaches to continuum micromechanics ==
=== Methods based on Finite Element Analysis (FEA) ===
Most such micromechanical methods use periodic homogenization, which approximates composites by periodic phase arrangements. A single repeating volume element is studied, appropriate boundary conditions being applied to extract the composite's macroscopic properties or responses. The Method of Macroscopic Degrees of Freedom can be used with commercial FE codes, whereas analysis based on asymptotic homogenization typically requires special-purpose codes. The Variational Asymptotic Method for Unit Cell Homogenization (VAMUCH) and its development, Mechanics of Structural Genome (see below), are recent Finite Element based approaches for periodic homogenization. A general introduction to Computational Micromechanics can be found in Zohdi and Wriggers (2005).

In addition to studying periodic microstructures, embedding models and analysis using macro-homogeneous or mixed uniform boundary conditions can be carried out on the basis of FE models. Due to its high flexibility and efficiency, FEA at present is the most widely used numerical tool in continuum micromechanics, allowing, e.g., the handling of viscoelastic, elastoplastic and damage behavior.

=== Mechanics of Structure Genome (MSG) ===
A unified theory called mechanics of structure genome (MSG) has been introduced to treat structural modeling of anisotropic heterogeneous structures as special applications of micromechanics. Using MSG, it is possible to directly compute structural properties of a beam, plate, shell or 3D solid in terms of its microstructural details.

=== Generalized Method of Cells (GMC) ===
Explicitly considers fiber and matrix subcells from periodic repeating unit cell. Assumes 1st-order displacement field in subcells and imposes traction and displacement continuity. It was developed into the High-Fidelity GMC (HFGMC), which uses quadratic approximation for the displacement fields in the subcells.

=== Fast Fourier Transforms (FFT) ===
A further group of periodic homogenization models make use of Fast Fourier Transforms (FFT), e.g., for solving an equivalent to the Lippmann–Schwinger equation. FFT-based methods at present appear to provide the numerically most efficient approach to periodic homogenization of elastic materials.

== Volume Elements ==
Ideally, the volume elements used in numerical approaches to continuum micromechanics should be sufficiently big to fully describe the statistics of the phase arrangement of the material considered, i.e., they should be Representative Volume Elements (RVEs). In practice, smaller volume elements must typically be used due to limitations in available computational power. Such volume elements are often referred to as Statistical Volume Elements (SVEs). Ensemble averaging over a number of SVEs may be used for improving the approximations to the macroscopic responses.

== See also ==
- Micromechanics of Failure
- Eshelby's inclusion
- Representative elementary volume
- Composite material
- Metamaterial
- Negative index metamaterials
- John Eshelby
- Rodney Hill
- Zvi Hashin
