= Joseph P. Heremans =

Condensed matter experimental physicist

Joseph P. Heremans Membership of NAE
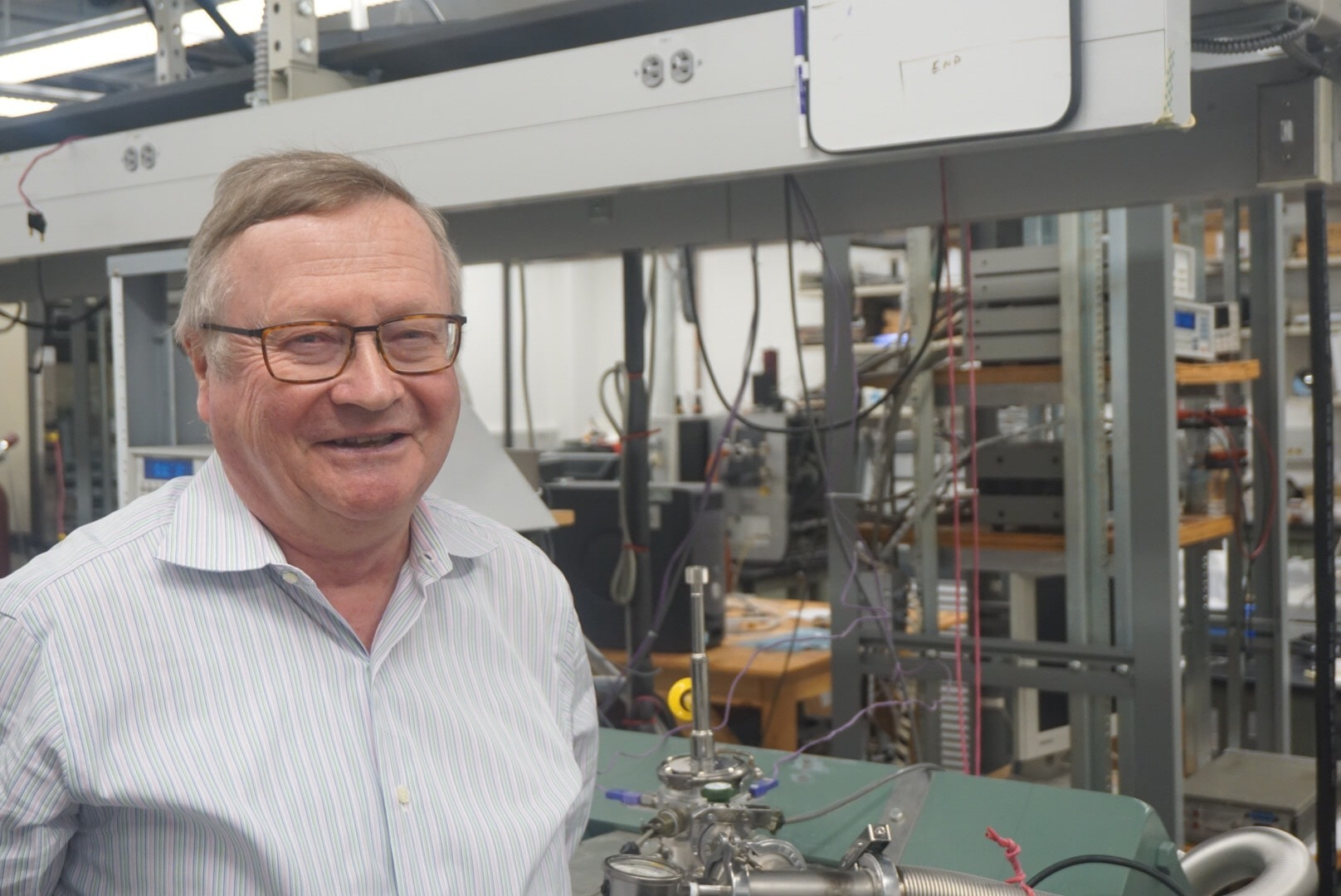
- Heremans in his lab
- Education: University of Louvain
- Awards: Membership of NAE (2013); Fellowship of AAAS (2011); Fellowship of APS (1987)
- Scientific career
- Fields: Physics; Material Science; Mechanical Engineering
- Workplaces: Ohio State University; Delphi Research Lab; GM Research Lab
- Website: tml.engineering.osu.edu

Joseph P. Heremans was a condensed matter experimental physicist at The Ohio State University where he held titles as Ohio Eminent Scholar and Professor in the Department of Mechanical and Aerospace Engineering, with courtesy appointments in the Department of Physics and Department of Materials Science and Engineering. He was a member of the National Academy of Engineering and fellow of the American Physical Society and the American Association for the Advancement of Science. His research focused on magneto-transport, thermal, and thermoelectric properties of electrons, phonons, and spin in narrow-gap semiconductors, semimetals, and nanostructures. Prior to OSU, Heremans worked as a research scientist and research manager at GM Research Lab from 1984-1998 and the Delphi Research Labs (1999-2005), where he developed tunable IR diode lasers and magnetic sensors.

== Education ==
Heremans was educated at the École Polytechnique de Louvain, the college of engineering of the Catholic University of Louvain (Université Catholique de Louvain) where he received a Bachelor of Science degree in electrical engineering (Ingénieur Civil Electricien) in 1975 followed by a Doctor of Applied Sciences degree (Docteur en Sciences Appliquées) in applied physics in 1978. His Ph.D. training included a Research Fellowship with the Belgian Institute for Research in Industry and Agriculture (IRSIA). Following his formal education, Prof. Heremans worked as invited postdoctoral scientist, including at the Oersted Institute at the University of Copenhagen, where he worked under the direction of Prof. Ole P. Hansen, the Massachusetts Institute of Technology, where he worked under the direction of Prof. Millie Dresselhaus, and the Institute for Solid State Physics at the University of Tokyo, where he worked under the direction of Prof. Seichi Tanuma. Concurrently with these postdoctoral assignments, he worked as a researcher for the Fonds National Belge de la Recherche Scientifique.

== Career and research ==
Heremans' research involved experimental investigation of electron, magnon, and phonon transport properties; narrow-gap semiconductor physics (primarily InSb, PbTe, and BiSb alloys), semimetals (primarily bismuth and graphite), and nanostructures. His early work at GM focused on PbTe-based infrared diode lasers and other properties of semiconductors (e.g. he showed that molten carbon is a metal).

In the 1990s, Heremans developed the geometrical magnetoseebeck and magnetoresistance effects, the latter of which resulted in commercial position sensors used on crank and camshafts by GM. In the early 2000s, his work on quantum wires resulted in the discovery of large thermopowers due to size-quantization effects. In 2008, his team published evidence that resonant levels increase the thermoelectric figure of merit, zT, in PbTe by distorting the electronic density of states. The focus of his laboratory switched to spin caloritronic effects around 2010.

In 2012, his team published data proving the giant spin-Seebeck effect in a non-magnetic material; they demonstrated that the giant spin-Seebeck effect in InSb is as large as the largest thermopower values ever measured.

In 2013, Heremans was elected a member of the National Academy of Engineering for discoveries in thermal energy transfer and conversion to electricity, and for commercial devices employed in automobiles.

In 2015, his team published experimental proof that phonons in diamagnets respond to magnetic fields, proving that heat and sound can be controlled magnetically.

In a recent review paper, he outlined the difficulties in obtaining truly electrically insulating topological insulators. Most recently, he and several colleagues developed goniopolar materials, materials that, due to the specific shape and topology of their Fermi surface, display simultaneous n- and p-type behavior of the same charge carriers, depending on the direction and type of measurement.

In his career, he published over 250 publications in refereed journals and conference proceedings. These publications have been cited over 11,000 times, with his most-cited paper "Enhancement of Thermoelectric Efficiency in PbTe by Distortion of the Electronic Density of States," which has been cited more than 1800 times. He has been issued 39 U.S. patents and co-edited two books.

== Honors and awards ==
In 1987, Heremans was named fellow of the American Physical Society for his pioneering work in the thermal conductivity of low-dimensional materials and electronic magnetostriction; and for the study of electronic and thermal properties of narrow-gap semiconductors, semimetals, and graphite intercalation compounds. In 2011, he was named fellow of American Association for the Advancement of Science, and he was elected to the National Academy of Engineering in 2013.

Heremans won several awards at OSU: the Clara M. and Peter L. Scott Award for Excellence in Engineering Education (2014), the Lumley Interdisciplinary Research Award (2013, 2019), the Lumley Award (2010), the Innovators Award (2010), and the Inventor of the Year Award (2011). At General Motors he was the recipient of the Charles L. McCuen Award (1994), the John M. Campbell Award (1989) and the Boss Kettering Award (1994). At Delphi he was elected to the Inventors Hall of Fame (1999), Gold Level (2004), and won the Scientific Excellence Award (2003).
