= Eshelby's inclusion =

Set of problems in continuum mechanics

An inclusion in a linear elastic body. The stiffness tensor of the body is C_{0} and that of the inclusion is C_{i}. When the body and the inclusion have different elastic properties the inclusion is called an inhomogeneity. A transformation strain changes the shape and size of the inclusion.

In continuum mechanics, Eshelby's inclusion problem refers to a set of problems involving ellipsoidal elastic inclusions in an infinite elastic body. Analytical solutions to these problems were first devised by John D. Eshelby in 1957.

Eshelby started with a thought experiment on the possible stress, strain, and displacement fields in a linear elastic body containing an inclusion. In particular, he considered the situation in which the inclusion has undergone a transformation (such as twinning or localized thermal expansion) but its change in shape and size are restricted because of the surrounding material. In that situation, the inclusion and the surrounding material remains in a stressed state. Also the strain states in the body and the inclusion are potentially inhomogeneous and complicated.

Eshelby found that the resulting elastic field can be found using a "sequence of imaginary cutting, straining and welding operations." Eshelby's finding that the strain and stress field inside the ellipsoidal inclusion is uniform and has a closed-form solution, regardless of the material properties and initial transformation strain (also called the eigenstrain), has spawned a large amount of work in the mechanics of composites.

The results find their applications in the effective medium theory for heterogeneous elastic materials.

== Bibliography ==
- Eshelby, J.D. (1957), "The determination of the elastic field of an ellipsoidal inclusion, and related problems" (PDF), Proceedings of the Royal Society A, 241 (1226): 376–396, Bibcode:1957RSPSA.241..376E, doi:10.1098/rspa.1957.0133, S2CID 122550488
- Eshelby, J.D. (1959), "The elastic field outside an ellipsoidal inclusion", Proceedings of the Royal Society A, 252 (1271): 561–569, Bibcode:1959RSPSA.252..561E, doi:10.1098/rspa.1959.0173, S2CID 119853168

== See also ==
- Micromechanics
