= Xue Qikun =

Chinese physicist

- 薛其坤
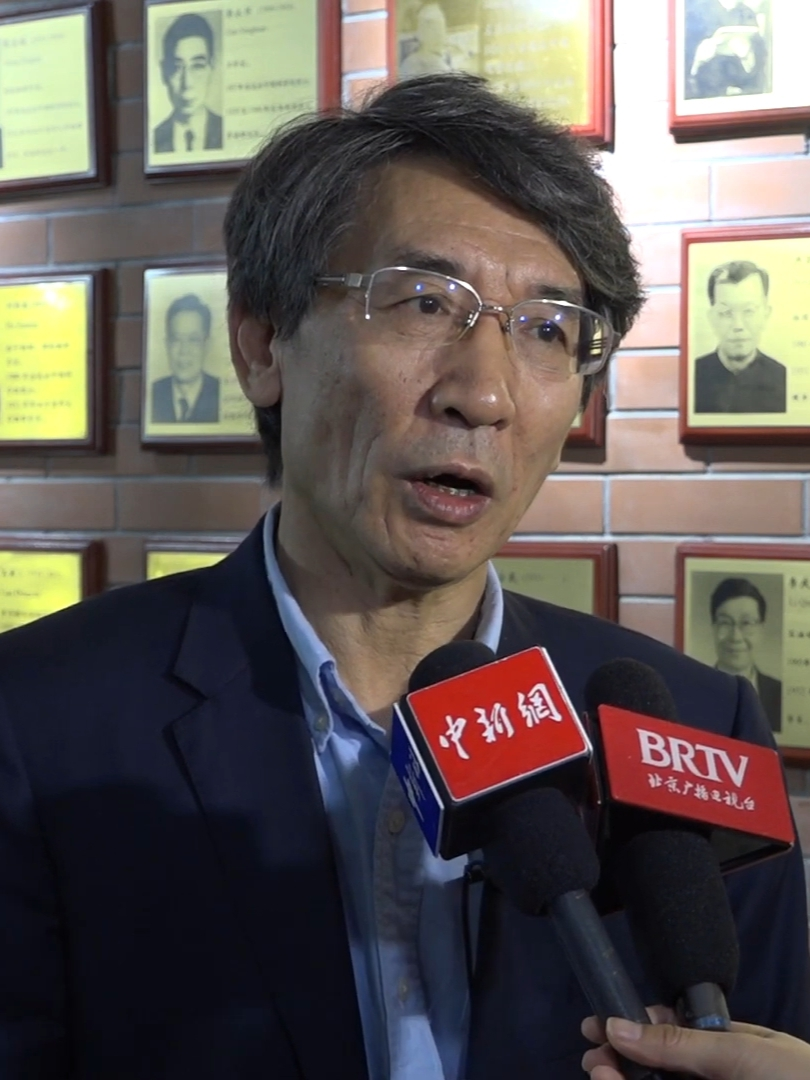
- Xue in 2023

President of Southern University of Science and Technology
- Incumbent
- Assumed office November 2020
- Preceded by: Chen Shiyi

Personal details
- Born: 19 December 1963 (age 62) Mengyin County, Shandong, China
- Education: Chinese Academy of Sciences; Shandong University
- Scientific career
- Known for: quantum anomalous Hall effect
- Awards: TWAS Prize (2010); Future Science Prize (2015); Oliver E. Buckley Prize (2024); Clarivate Citation in Physics (2026)
- Fields: Quantum physics Topological insulators
- Workplaces: Tsinghua University
- Website: info.phys.tsinghua.edu.cn/xuegroup/

Xue Qikun (Chinese: 薛其坤; pinyin: Xuē Qíkūn; born December 1963) is a Chinese physicist. He is a professor of Tsinghua University, Beijing. He has done much work in condensed matter physics, especially on superconductors and topological insulators. In 2013, Xue was the first to achieve the quantum anomalous Hall effect (QAHE), an unusual orderly motion of electrons in a conductor, in his laboratory at Tsinghua University. Xue is a member of the Chinese Academy of Sciences, vice president for research of Tsinghua University, and director of State Key Lab of Quantum Physics. In 2016, he was one of the first recipients of the new Chinese Future Science Prize for experimental discovery of high-temperature superconductivity at material interfaces and the QAHE. This award has been described as "China's Nobel Prize".

== Career ==
Xue earned his PhD from the Institute of Physics, Chinese Academy of Sciences in 1994. From 1994 to 2000, he worked as a research associate at Institute for Materials Research, Tohoku University, Japan, and as a visiting assistant professor at the Physics Department of North Carolina State University, US. He became a professor at the Institute of Physics, Chinese Academy of Sciences, in 1999, and since 2005 has worked as a professor in the Physics Department of Tsinghua University. He is a partner investigator in Australia's ARC Centre of Excellence in Future Low-Energy Electronics Technologies. In 2020, he became the president of Southern University of Science and Technology (SUSTech).

== Research and achievements ==
Xue pioneered high quality thin films of topological insulators and, in 2013, first achieved the quantum anomalous Hall effect (QAHE), at Tsinghua University. Nobel Laureate Chen-Ning Yang called this discovery "worthy of a Nobel Prize". Xue's current research aims at preparation of low-dimensional structures exhibiting pronounced quantum phenomena, and understanding of growth dynamics and quantum mechanical effects on solid surfaces and in thin films, including:

- atomic-scale probing of surface electronic and magnetic properties by scanning tunneling microscopy and spectroscopy
- molecular beam epitaxial growth of novel quantum materials including low-dimensional and interface-related superconductivity and topological insulators
- quantum size effects in various low-dimensional structures
- study of electronic band structures of thin films using angle resolved photoemission spectroscopy (ARPES) and molecular beam epitaxy.
- exploration of novel quantum phenomena in materials with transport measurements
- development of new measurement techniques with high spatial and energy resolutions

== Honors ==
- 2004, State Natural Science Second Class Award
- 2005, member of the Chinese Academy of Sciences
- 2010, TWAS Prize in Physics
- 2011, State Natural Science Second Class Award
- 2011, Outstanding Scientific Research Team Award
- 2014, Outstanding Scientist Award
- 2016, Future Science Prize in physical science
- 2017, Asian Scientist 100, Asian Scientist
- 2020, Fritz London Memorial Prize for low-temperature physics
- 2024, Oliver E. Buckley Prize
- 2026, Clarivate Citation laureate in Physics

== Selected papers ==
1. Experimental Observation of the Quantum Anomalous Hall Effect in a Magnetic Topological Insulator
2. Superconductivity in One-Atomic-Layer Metal Films Grown on Si(111)
3. Superconductivity Modulated by Quantum Size Effects

Awards
Preceded by Bai Yilong	Recipient of the Mathematical Science Award of the Chen Jiageng Science Award; 2012	Succeeded by Wang Enge
Educational offices
Preceded by Chen Shiyi	President of Southern University of Science and Technology; 2020–present	Incumbent
