= Eastern Institute of Technology, Ningbo =

Private university in Ningbo, Zhejiang, China

- 宁波东方理工大学
- Type: Private university
- Established: June 19, 2025; 12 months ago
- Founder: Yu Renrong
- President: Chen Shiyi
- Location: Zhenhai, Ningbo, Zhejiang, China
- Website: eitech.edu.cn

The Eastern Institute of Technology, Ningbo (Chinese: 宁波东方理工大学) is a private university in Ningbo, Zhejiang, China. It was founded in June 2025 by the private Yu Renrong Education Foundation. Chen Shiyi serves as the president of the school.

== History ==
In August 2020, Ningbo entrepreneur Yu Renrong decided to donate funds to establish the university. On December 29, 2022, construction of the permanent campus began, with a planned total construction area of approximately 1.5 million square meters, scheduled to be completed and delivered in phases starting from 2025. According to news reports in December 2022, the school was provisionally named Eastern Institute of Technology, Ningbo, with the final name yet to be determined. On June 19, 2025, the Ministry of Education officially approved the establishment of the school. On August 30, 2025, the university held its first opening ceremony, and was officially inaugurated on November 28, 2025.
