= Yangsheng Xu =

- 徐扬生
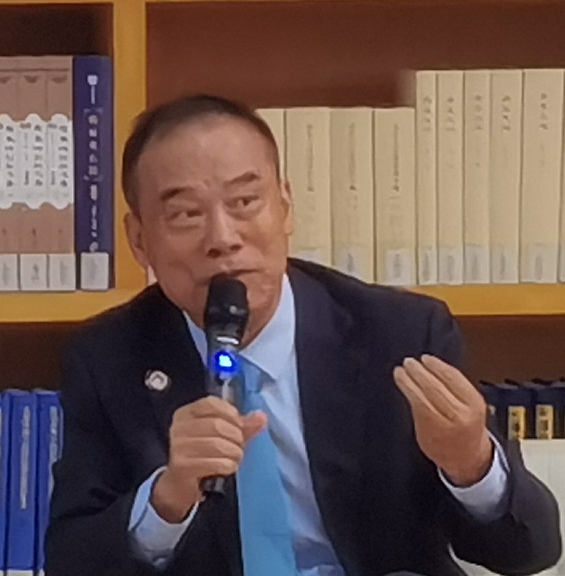

President of the Chinese University of Hong Kong, Shenzhen
- Incumbent
- Assumed office 1 August 2013

Personal details
- Born: April 7, 1958 (age 68) Shaoxing, Zhejiang, China
- Education: Zhejiang University, University of Pennsylvania

Xu Yangsheng (simplified Chinese: 徐扬生; traditional Chinese: 徐揚生; pinyin: Xú Yáng Shēng; born April 7, 1958) is a Chinese roboticist, aerospace engineer, and academic administrator. His research fields involve robotics, artificial intelligence (AI), and space technology, and a member of the Chinese Academy of Engineering (CAE). Xu has served as the founding president of The Chinese University of Hong Kong, Shenzhen (CUHK-Shenzhen) since 2013.

== Education ==
Xu was born in Shaoxing, Zhejiang Province, China. He earned his bachelor's degree in Aircraft Engineering from Zhejiang University in 1981. He also received a master's degree in engineering (MEng) from Zhejiang University. He moved to the United States, where he obtained his Ph.D. (1989) in Robotics and Artificial Intelligence from the University of Pennsylvania. His doctoral thesis was titled "Compliant wrist design and hybrid position-force control of robot manipulators."

== Academic career ==
After obtaining his Ph.D. Xu conducted research at Carnegie Mellon University (CMU), where he worked on NASA-funded space robotics projects. Xu was involved in the development of SM2 (Self-Mobile Manipulator) at Carnegie Mellon for space station applications.

Xu returned to Hong Kong on the day of the city's handover from Britain to China to join the Chinese University of Hong Kong (CUHK). At CUHK he served as a professor, specializing in intelligent systems and automation, and later served as Director of the Institute of Space and Earth Information Science.

== Leadership ==
As founding president of The Chinese University of Hong Kong, Shenzhen (2013–Present), Xu oversaw the establishment, construction, and development of the institution. The university expanded its research programs, particularly in fields such as artificial intelligence and robotics, while maintaining connections with industry partners in Shenzhen.

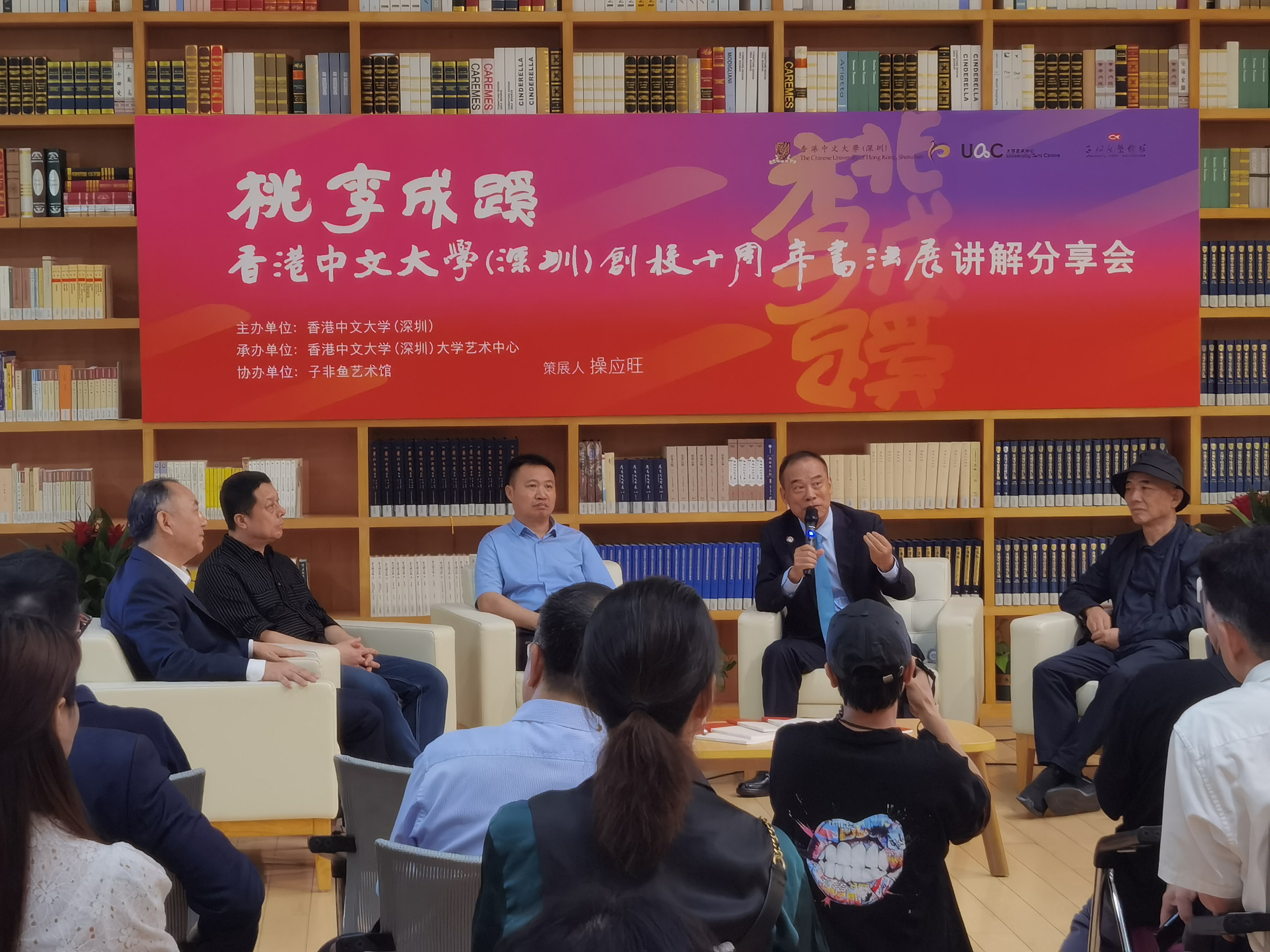
President Xu Yangsheng speaking at the library of The Chinese University of Hong Kong, Shenzhen, on April 30, 2024.

Xu stated the university was to benchmark itself against world-class institutions from its inception. English was adopted as the primary language of instruction to attract international talent and prepare graduates for global careers.

Xu is a calligrapher, blending Han Dynasty stele script with Qing Dynasty clerical script. His calligraphy is displayed across the CUHK-Shenzhen campus, including a library couplet and banners bearing the university's philosophy "Combining tradition with modernity, integrating China with the West". The university hosted exhibitions of his work in 2024 and 2025.

In March 2024, as part of the university's tenth anniversary celebrations, Xu served as the witness for a mass wedding ceremony involving 100 couples at CUHK-Shenzhen.

== Authorship ==
Xu has published several essay collections alongside academic books in his field of robotics and engineering.

In 2018, Xu published his first essay collection, The Ferryman (摆渡人), which includes over 20 essays. In March 2024, he published his second essay collection, Lake at Dusk (黄昏的神仙湖), featuring 35 essays and 60 digitally enhanced photographs. In June 2024, Xu published Reflections on Life: Mosquito on the Plane (生命的感悟：飛機上的蚊子) through Joint Publishing (Hong Kong), a collection of 36 essays.

== Honors ==
Professor Xu has received recognition for his contributions to robotics, space technology, and intelligent control systems.

- International Member, U.S. National Academy of Engineering (NAE) – 2021
- Fellow, Hong Kong Academy of Engineering Sciences (HKAES)
- Fellow, Hong Kong Institution of Engineers (HKIE)
- Member, Chinese Academy of Engineering (CAE) – 2007
- Corresponding Member, International Academy of Astronautics – 2007.
- Fellow, Institute of Electrical and Electronics Engineers (IEEE) – 2003
- Academician, Euroasian Academy of Sciences – 2001.
