= Toshio Mura =

Japanese engineer (1925–2009)

Toshio Mura (村 外志夫, Mura Toshio; December 7, 1925 – August 9, 2009) was a professor of engineering.

He was born in Ono, a small port village of Kanazawa Japan, on December 7, 1925. He received a doctorate in the Department of Applied Mathematics of the University of Tokyo in 1954. He taught at Meiji University, Japan from 1954 to 1958. In 1958, he went to the United States to work in the Department of Materials Science at Northwestern University in Evanston, Illinois. He became a professor in the Department of Civil Engineering in 1966 before his retirement in 1996, and also held an appointment in the Department of Mechanical Engineering.

Dr. Mura was appointed Walter P. Murphy Professor in the McCormick School of Engineering at Northwestern, was elected as a member of the National Academy of Engineering (NAE) in 1986 for his contributions to the field of micromechanics, and received many other accolades for his work. He was as much recognized for his academic achievement as his generosity in opening his home to visiting scholars and graduate students from Japan, where weekend gatherings were a regular occurrence.

Dr. Mura was interested in the micromechanics of solids. Examples of micromechanics are theories on fracture and fatigue of materials, mathematical analysis for dislocations and inclusions in solids, mechanical characterization of thin films, ceramics and composite materials.

Professor Mura was also interested in the inverse problems. His research aimed to predict inelastic damages in solids by knowing surface displacements on the surface of the solids, including prediction of earthquake by knowing the earth surface. The inverse problems play an important role in qualitative nondestructive evaluation of materials. Most of Professor Mura's research was mathematically oriented but cooperative with experiments in mechanics and materials science.

Professor Mura died of heart related complications on August 9, 2009, at the age of 83.

== Selected publications ==
- Mura, T. 1969. Mathematical Theory of Dislocations. Proceedings of ASME Symposium, Northwestern University.
- Mura, T. 1981. Mechanics of Fatigue. AMD-Vol. 47. Proceedings of ASME Symposium.
- Mura, T. 1987. Micromechanics of Defects in Solids (2nd ed.). The Netherlands: Martinus Nijhoff.
- Mura, T., and T. Koya. 1992. Variational methods in mechanics. Oxford University Press.
