= Hudong Chen =

Hudong Chen (Chinese: 陈沪东) is a physicist.

Chen was affiliated with the Bartol Research Institute, and later worked for Exa Corporation. He was elected a fellow of the American Physical Society in 1999, "[f]or contributions to fundamental fluid and magnetohydrodynamic turbulence theory, pioneering work in discrete many-body systems and Lattice Boltzmann representations, and industrial applications and practical numerical methods based upon these ideas."

Chen, senior director, Simulia Research and Development Technology, Dassault Systèmes, Waltham, Massachusetts is elected a member of the National Academy of Engineering for contributions to lattice Boltzmann simulation of turbulent flows and applications to automotive and aerospace industries in 2023 (NAE Class 2023).
