= Frederick H. Todd =

Frederick Henry Todd (20 August 1903 – 6 January 1992) was a British naval architect, a member of the United States National Academy of Engineering, and a recipient of Gibbs Brothers Medal from the U.S. National Academy of Sciences.

Todd was born in Newcastle upon Tyne, United Kingdom in 1903. He graduated with B.S. degree in naval architecture in 1925 and received his PhD in 1931 from Kings College, Durham University in England.
