= Yih-Ho Michael Pao =

Chinese-born American entrepreneur and hydro-engineer

Yih-Ho Michael Pao (21 September 1934 – 11 September 2013) was a Chinese-born American entrepreneur and hydro-engineer. He was an early pioneer in developing large-scale wind turbines.

Pao graduated from Johns Hopkins University (JHU) in 1962. In 2009, JHU awarded Pao its Distinguished Alumni Award.

Between 1970 and 2000, he formed and led six commercial companies in the United States based upon new technologies. These efforts created, developed and commercialized four new technologies that produce industrial tools:

1. Waterjet technology
2. Horizontal directional drilling technology
3. Vertical axis wind turbine technology
4. Advanced wet-blasting technology

In 2000, Pao was elected a member of the National Academy of Engineering (NAE) for his research, development, and commercialization of ultrahigh-pressure waterjet technology. Pao's elder brother Yih-Hsing had been elected to the NAE fifteen years earlier.

Pao died in Houston, Texas on 11 September 2013.
