= Yih-Hsing Pao =

Chinese-born American mechanical engineer (1930–2013)

Yih-Hsing Pao (Chinese: 鮑亦興; 19 January 1930 – 18 June 2013) was a Chinese-born American mechanical engineer.

== Early life, education, and career in the United States ==
Pao was born in Nanjing on 19 January 1930. His education and early life were impacted by the Second Sino-Japanese War and the Chinese Civil War. The Pao family moved from Nanjing to Chongqing following the Marco Polo Bridge Incident. His mother taught Pao and his younger brother Michael to read the Four Books. Pao attended National Chiao Tung University, then based in Shanghai, for two years. During his time in Shanghai, there were frequent student-led protests supportive of democracy, and he was a member of the student government. Later, his family relocated from Guangzhou to Taiwan. Pao followed them to Taiwan via ship on 30 April 1949, and subsequently graduated in 1952 from National Taiwan University with a degree in civil engineering. He received a scholarship from Rensselaer Polytechnic Institute to pursue graduate study in mechanics, and his father borrowed money to pay for Pao's airfare of US$600. Pao completed his master's degree and continued on to doctoral study in applied mechanics, specializing in wave propagation in solids, at Columbia University. Before formally obtaining his doctorate in 1959, Pao joined the Cornell University faculty in 1958. In 1985, he was appointed to the J. C. Ford Professorship, a title he retained until retirement and emeritus status in 2000.

== Career in China and Taiwan ==
At the invitation of Li Kwoh-ting in 1983, Pao returned to Taiwan to serve as founding leader of the Institute of Applied Mechanics at National Taiwan University. Between 1992 and 1995, he served as president of the Chinese Society of Theoretical and Applied Mechanics, based in Taipei. In 2009, Pao was formally appointed a Distinguished Research Chair Professor within NTU's Institute of Applied Mechanics. From 2003, he had held a professorship at the College of Civil Engineering and Architecture within Zhejiang University in China.

== Honors and awards ==
Pao's honors and awards included election as member of the United States National Academy of Engineering in 1985, and an equivalent honor from Taiwan's Academia Sinica in 1986. He participated in the Humboldt Research Award Programme and is a recipient of the Humboldt Foundation's Senior Scientist Award. In 2001, Pao won Presidential Science Prize for Applied Sciences. A conference was held in Taipei to mark Pao's 80th birthday in 2010, and the presented papers, alongside some of Pao's own works, were compiled into a Festschrift titled From Waves in Complex Systems to Dynamics of Generalized Continua, published in 2011.

== Personal life ==
Pao was diagnosed with retinitis pigmentosa in 1980. The condition caused him to become blind.

Pao was married to Amelia, with whom he raised three children, Winston, May, and Sophie. He died on 18 June 2013.
