= Gao Song (chemist) =

Professor in chemistry

- 高松
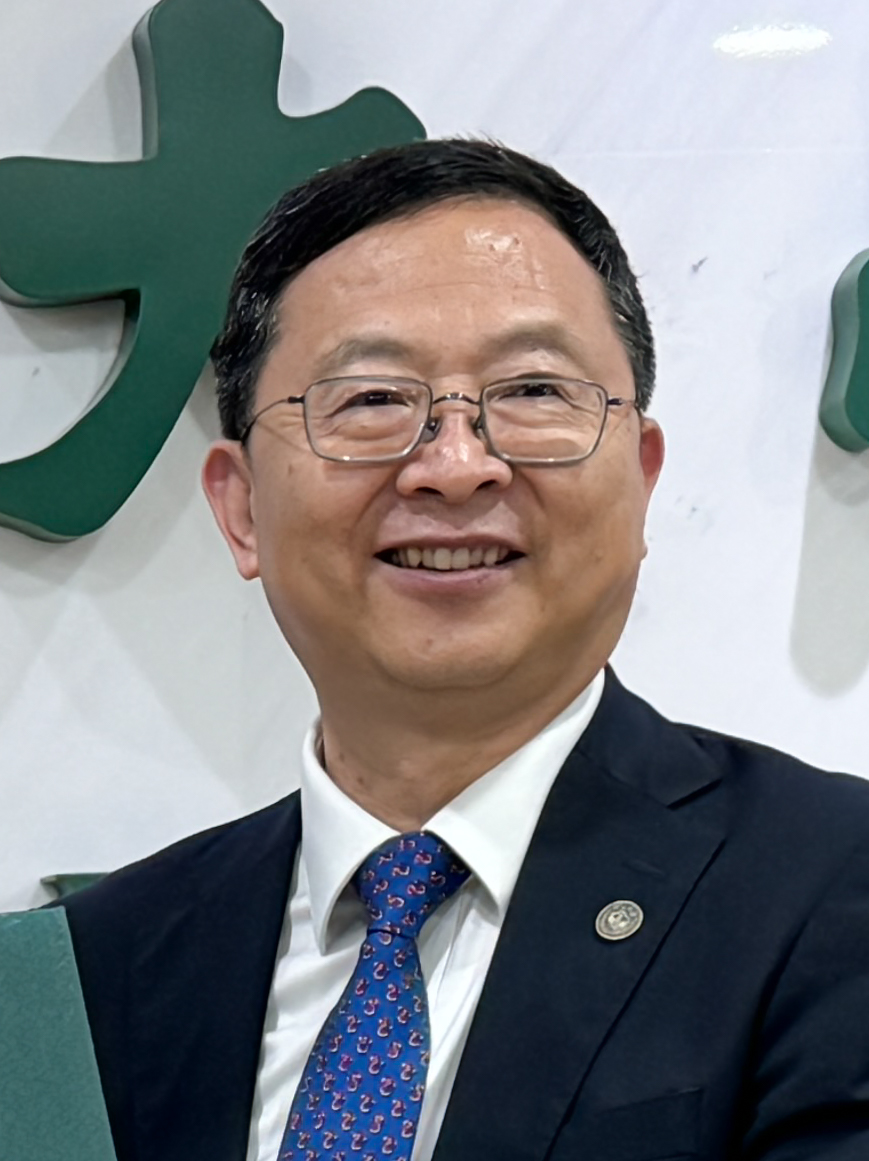

President of South China University of Technology
- In office 2018–2021
- Succeeded by: Liqun Zhang

Personal details
- Born: 1964 (age 61–62) Anhui, China
- Education: Peking University
- Profession: University President
- Scientific career
- Education: Peking University
- Fields: Chemistry
- Workplaces: South China University of Technology
- Thesis: (1991)

Goa Song (Chinese: 高松) is a professor in chemistry and president of Sun Yat-sen University since 2021. He was president of the South China University of Technology from 2018 to 2022.

== Early life ==
Born in Anhui province in 1964, Gao studied chemistry at Peking University, China and received his bachelor's, master's, and doctoral degrees in 1985, 1988, and 1991, respectively.

== Career ==
After his Ph.D., Gao became a lecturer (1990-1992), associate professor (1992-1999), and professor (since 1999) at Peking University. In 1992, Gao went to Germany to become a visitor of Aachen University of Technology, Institute of Inorganic Chemistry. In 1998–1999, he went to University of Hong Kong as a visiting scholar. He became Dean of the Department of Chemistry at Peking University in 2006. From 2013 to 2017, he was a vice president at Peking University. In 2018, he was appointed President of South China University of Technology.

== Research ==
Gao has undertaken research on inorganic chemistry and molecular magnetism. He has published over 300 papers in these topics.

== Awards ==
In 2007, Gao was elected a member of Chinese Academy of Sciences and a fellow of the Royal Society of Chemistry, UK.
