= Phillip S. Myers =

American mechanical engineer (1916–2006)

Phillip Samuel Myers (8 May 1916 – 18 October 2006) was an American mechanical engineer.

A native of Webber, Kansas, Phillip Samuel Myers was born to parents Earl Myers and Sarah Catherine Breon on 8 May 1916. He earned a bachelor's of science degree from McPherson College in 1940, and completed a second bachelor's degree in mechanical engineering at Kansas State College in 1942, then joined the University of Wisconsin–Madison faculty upon graduation. While teaching, he completed a master's of science (1944) and doctorate (1947) in mechanical engineering at UW–Madison as well. Myers obtained tenure in 1950, and became a full professor in 1955. He chaired UW–Madison's Department of Mechanical Engineering from 1979 to 1983, and was granted emeritus status upon retirement in 1986.

In 1969, Myers became the first academic to serve as president of the Society of Automotive Engineers, and the SAE later elected him a fellow in 1977. He was elected a 1971 fellow of the American Society of Mechanical Engineers, and ten years later won the AMSE's Internal Combustion Engine Award. In 1973, he was elected a member of the National Academy of Engineering, recognized for his "contributions to the understanding of ignition and heat transfer problems of internal combustion engines and their environmental impact." In 1998, Myers was elected a fellow of the American Association for the Advancement of Science. Myers died on 18 October 2006, aged 90.
