= Zvi Hashin =

Israeli mechanical engineer

- צבי חשין
- Born: 1929 (age 96–97)
- Died: October 29, 2017

Zvi Hashin (Hebrew: צבי חשין; 1929–29 October 2017) was an Israeli mechanical engineer. He was a professor for engineering sciences at Tel Aviv University. In 2012, he won the Benjamin Franklin Medal in Mechanical Engineering, for his research on micro-mechanics of failure of fibre-reinforced plastic.

== Publications ==
- Z. Hashin, Failure criteria for unidirectional fiber composites, J. Appl. Mech.,47, 329–334 (1980).
