= Chinese University of Hong Kong, Shenzhen =

University in Shenzhen, Guangdong, China

The Chinese University of Hong Kong, Shenzhen
- 香港中文大学（深圳）
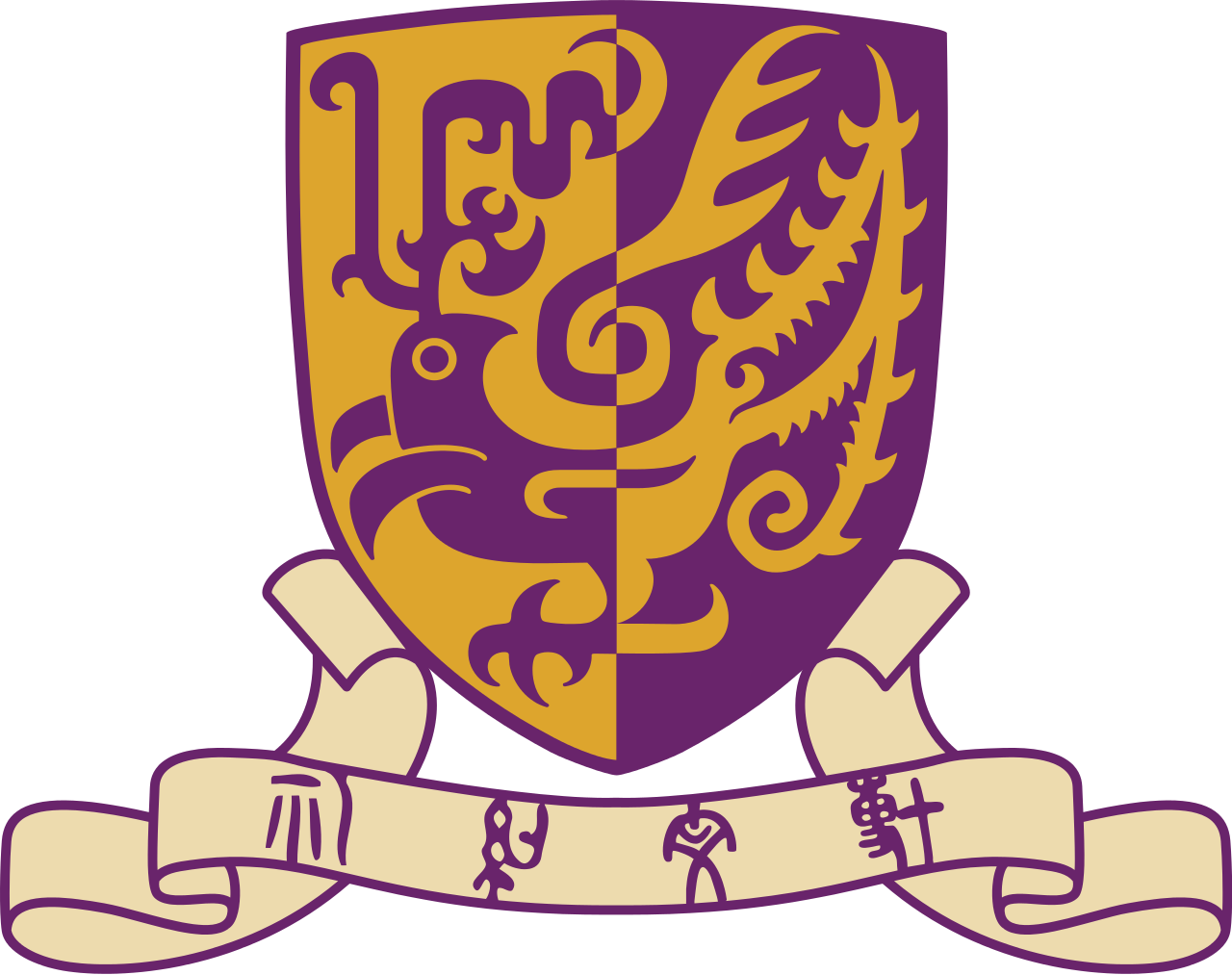
- The Emblem of CUHK
- Motto: 博文約禮
- Motto in English: Through learning and temperance to virtue
- Type: Cooperative university
- Established: 21 March 2014; 12 years ago
- Parent institution: Chinese University of Hong Kong and Shenzhen University
- Chairman: Dennis Lo Yuk-ming
- President: Yangsheng Xu
- Academic staff: 600 (September 2024)
- Students: > 12,000 (April 2026)
- Location: Shenzhen, Guangdong, China; 22°41′24″N 114°12′29″E
- Language: English (primary); Mandarin Chinese
Colours
Purple & Gold
- Mascot: Phoenix
- Website: cuhk.edu.cn/en

Chinese name
- Simplified Chinese: 香港中文大学（深圳）
- Traditional Chinese: 香港中文大學（深圳）
Transcriptions
Standard Mandarin
- Hanyu Pinyin: Xiānggǎng Zhōngwén Dàxué (Shēnzhèn)
Yue: Cantonese
- Jyutping: Hoeng1gong2 Zung1man4 Daai6hok6 (Sam1zan3)

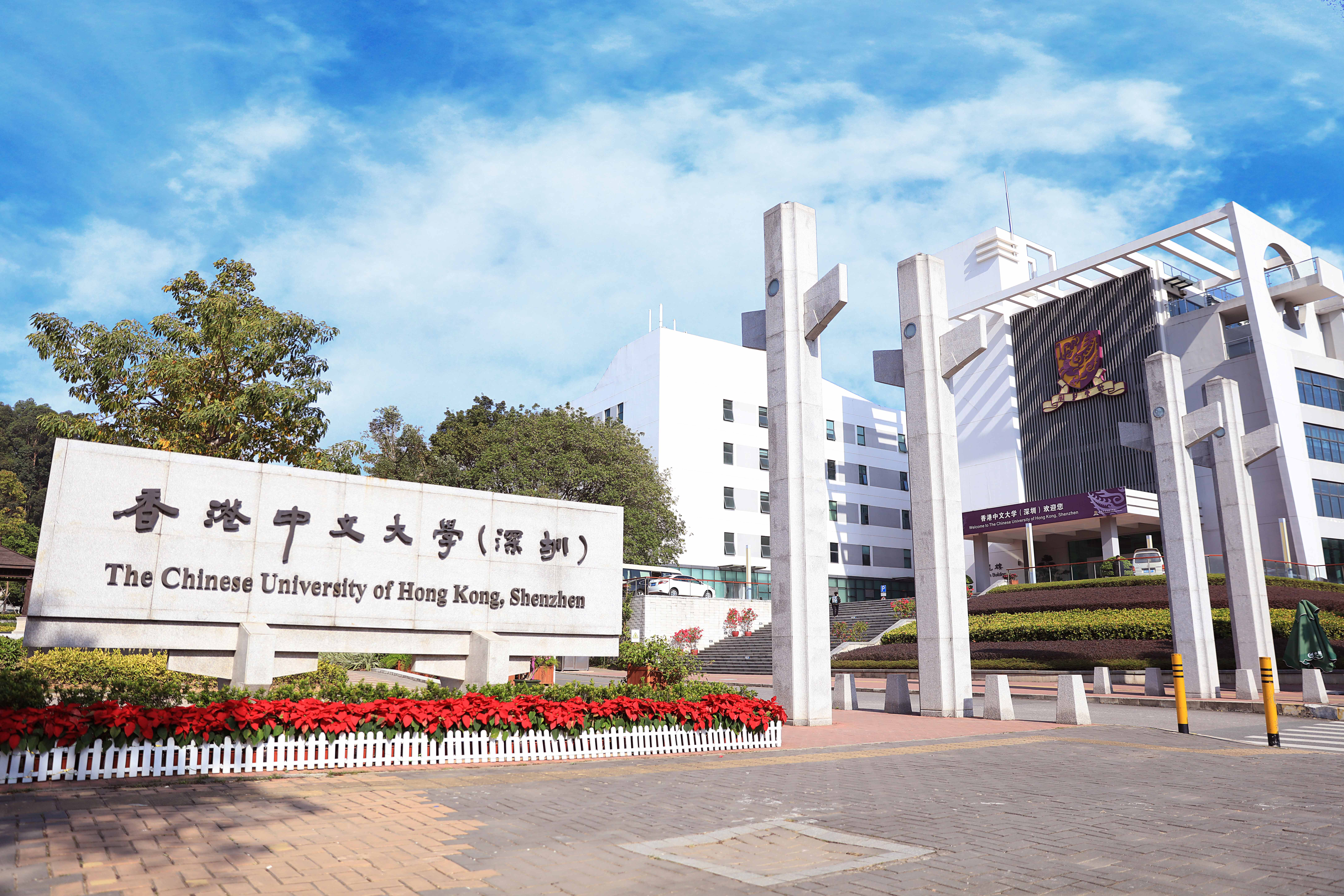
The Old South Gate of the campus.

The Chinese University of Hong Kong, Shenzhen (abbreviated as CUHK–Shenzhen or CUHK–SZ) is a university in Longgang, Shenzhen, Guangdong, China. It was initiated through cooperation between the Chinese University of Hong Kong and the Shenzhen Municipal People's Government, and was formally approved by the Ministry of Education of China on 21 March 2014. It was established under the regulatory framework governing cooperation between mainland Chinese and Hong Kong educational institutions.

CUHK describes its relationship with CUHK–Shenzhen as "one brand, two campuses". The two campuses use the same phoenix emblem and the university motto, "Through learning and temperance to virtue" (博文約禮). CUHK–Shenzhen follows CUHK's academic system, and its academic programmes are approved by the CUHK Senate; the two campuses are also closely aligned in their educational philosophies and governance structures.

CUHK–Shenzhen graduates receive a degree awarded by CUHK, with "Shenzhen" indicated on the degree certificate, as well as a graduation certificate issued by CUHK–Shenzhen.

As of April 2026, more than 12,000 undergraduate and postgraduate students are studying at CUHK-Shenzhen.

== History ==
On 21 March 2014, the Ministry of Education of the People's Republic of China officially sent a letter to the People's Government of Guangdong Province, agreeing to approve the establishment of the Chinese University of Hong Kong, Shenzhen.

Upon the establishment of the new institution, some Chinese University of Hong Kong alumni in Hong Kong criticized the similarity between the CUHK and CUHK–Shenzhen graduation certificates. A CUHK alumni concern group stated that the certificate should include the word Shenzhen in the title, and should mention Shenzhen University. A spokeswoman for CUHK stated that "As [the] CUHK–Shenzhen degree is conferred by CUHK, the format of the certificate follows that of CUHK's", and that the layout of the certificate was officially approved by the CUHK Senate in 2015.

== Academics ==
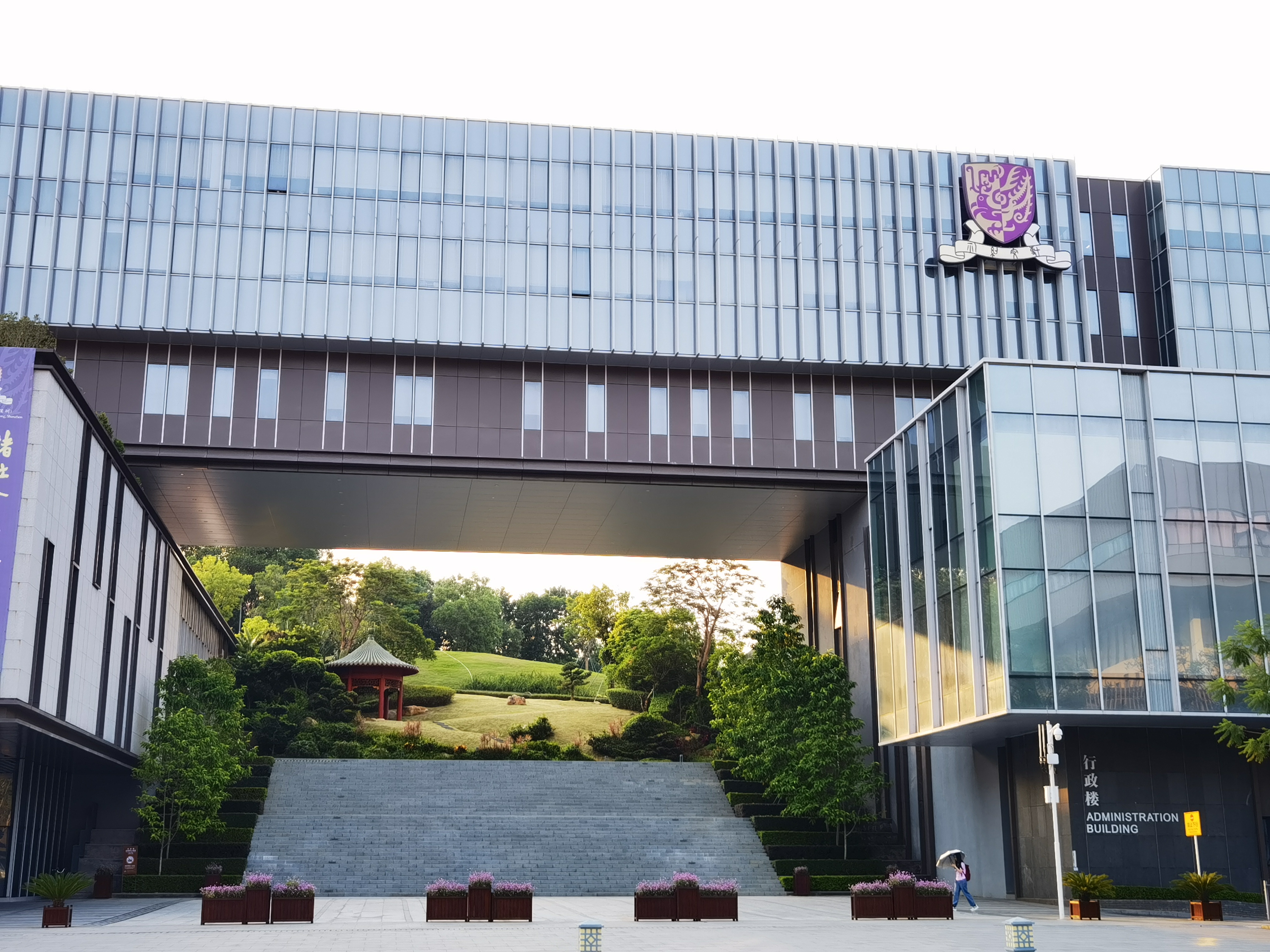
The Administration Building.

The language of instruction is all in English, except for physical education and Chinese language courses, which are bilingual in English and Mandarin Chinese.

CUHK degrees will be conferred to students of CUHK–Shenzhen who meet the requirements of their degree programs. A graduation certificate will also be conferred by CUHK-Shenzhen.

There are two "Nobel laureate research labs" in CUHK-Shenzhen led by the Nobel laureates Arieh Warshel and Brian Kobilka.

CUHK–Shenzhen participated in the signing ceremony for the jointly initiated "Shenzhen International Friendship City University League", which was initiated by Southern University of Science and Technology, on 9 July 2014.

On 30 April 2015, the fifth annual Presidents Forum of Worldwide Universities Network convened at the campus.

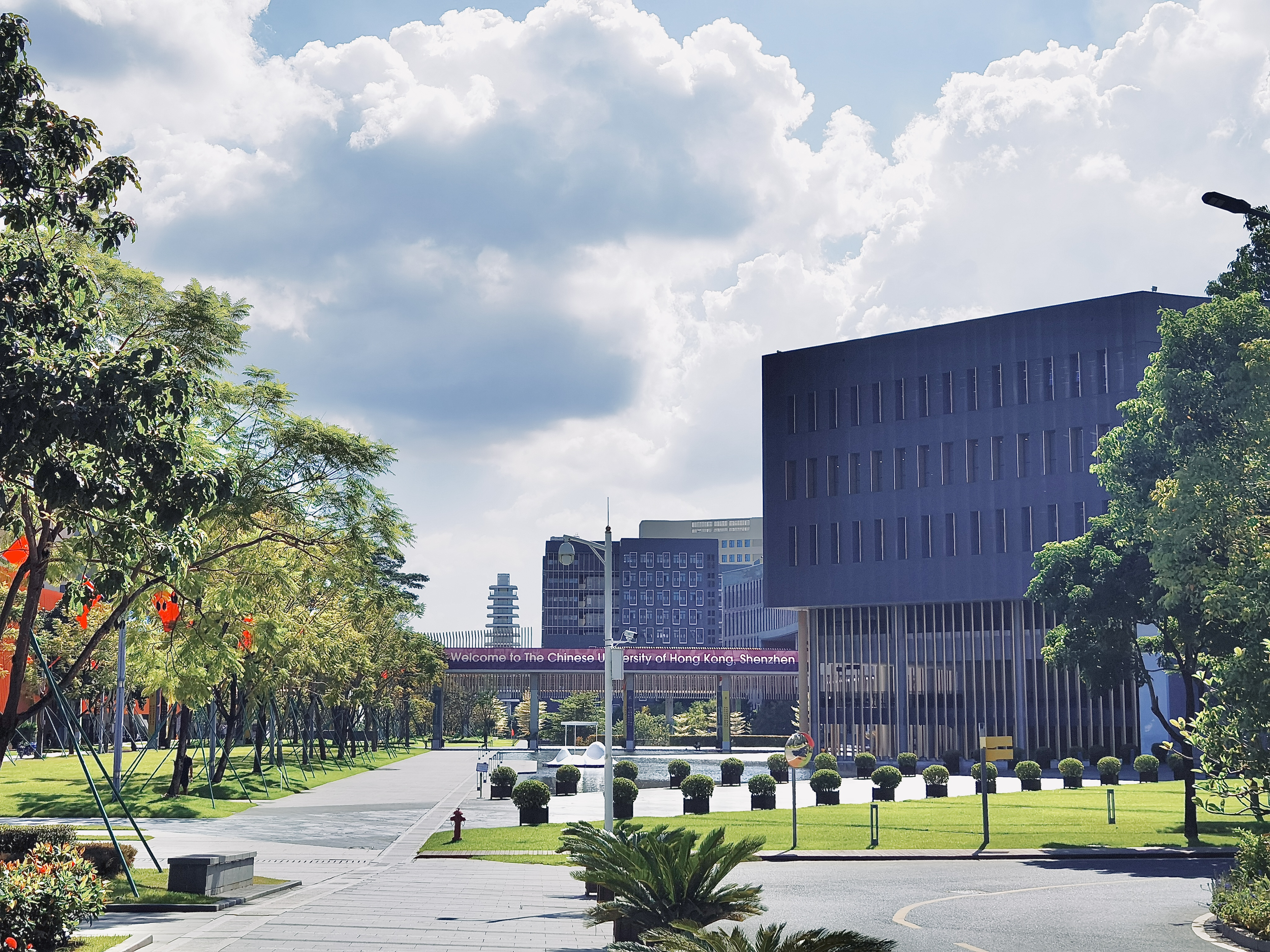
The Central Avenue of the campus.

== Campus ==
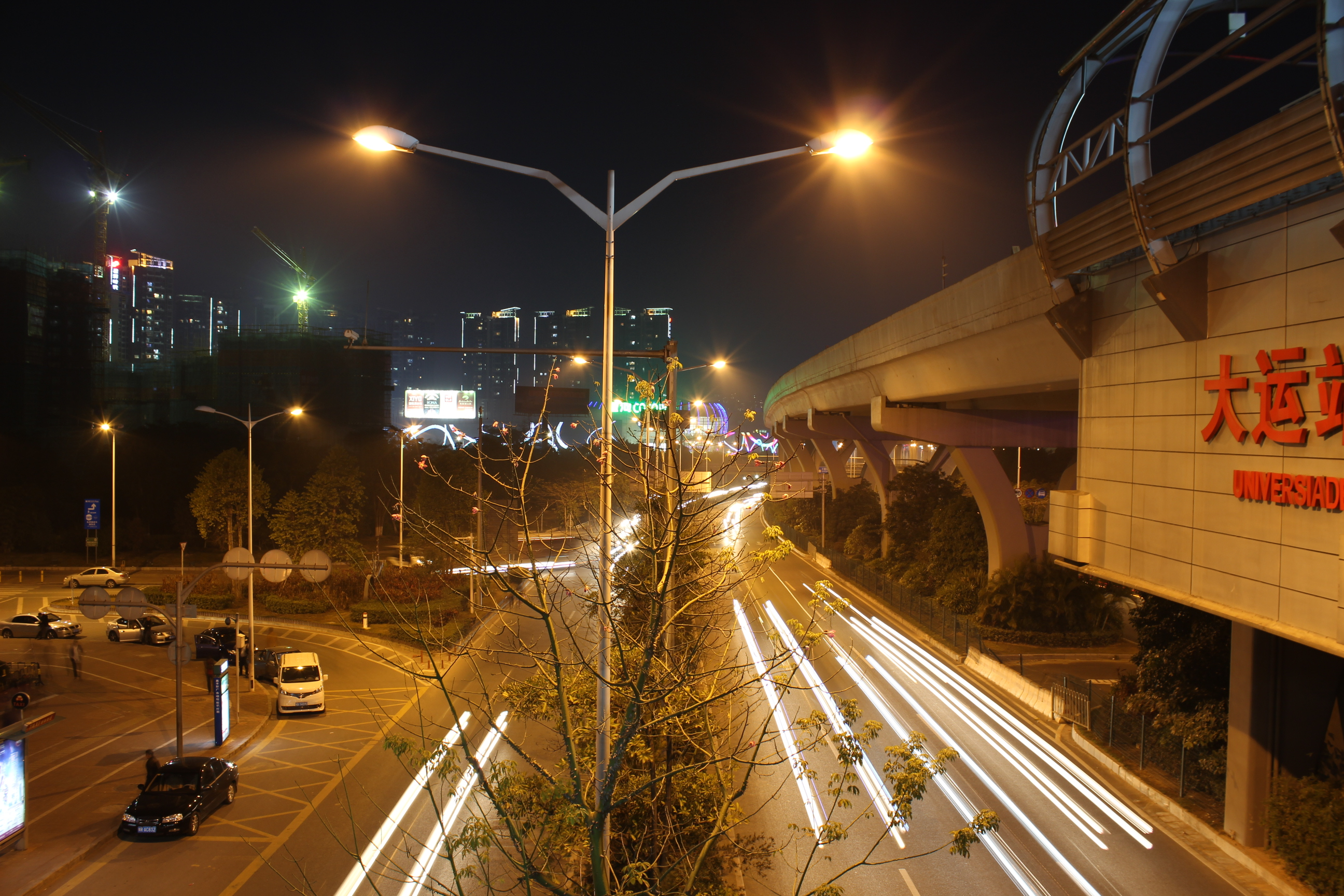
A night view of Universiade station of Shenzhen Metro.

The campus is located in No. 2001 Longxiang Boulevard, Longcheng Street, Longgang District, which is in the northeastern part of Shenzhen, surrounded by mountainous area with distances of around 15 kilometres northeast of downtown Shenzhen and 30 kilometres north of CUHK's campus in Sha Tin, Hong Kong. A cross-border shuttle bus runs between the CUHK and CUHK-Shenzhen campuses, but it is restricted to staff, staff family members, student groups, and invited guests.

== Colleges ==
The Chinese University of Hong Kong, Shenzhen maintains a college system with eight residential colleges, continuing the tradition of its Hong Kong counterpart. Each college has its own motto and is led by a College Master.

As of 2025, seven colleges have received patronage.

1. Shaw College (逸夫书院) was established in 2016 with support from the Shaw Foundation, guided by its motto "In Pursuit of Virtue and Excellence" (修德臻善).
2. Diligentia College (学勤书院) was established in 2016 through the Genzon Foundation's support, embracing the motto "Cultivating the self to serve society" (修己以善群，力行致良知).
3. Muse College (思廷书院) was established in 2016 with donations from Horoy Holdings and Mr. & Mrs. Lai, upholding "Principles and Practice, Dedication to Humanity" (道器并重，兼善天下).
4. Harmonia College (祥波书院) was established in 2018 in honor of Mr. Yang Xiangbo (Shirble Group), following "Scholarship, Perseverance, Excellence" (博学慎思，弘毅致远).
5. Ling College (道扬书院) was established in 2022 to commemorate Prof. Ling Daoyang, embodying "To Cultivate the Self, and Benefit Others" (修己自强，利他先行).
6. Minerva College (厚含书院) was established in 2022 through Shenzhen Hexi Industrial's donation, promoting "Kindness, Inclusiveness, Dedication and Creativity" (仁厚包容，敬业创新).
7. Duan Family College (永平书院) was established in 2023, maintaining the university's founding principle "Mission, Character, and Service" (使命、品格、服务).
8. Eighth College (第八书院) was established in 2025, situated in the CUHK-Shenzhen School of Music campus (provisional Shenzhen Conservatory of Music campus).

== Schools ==
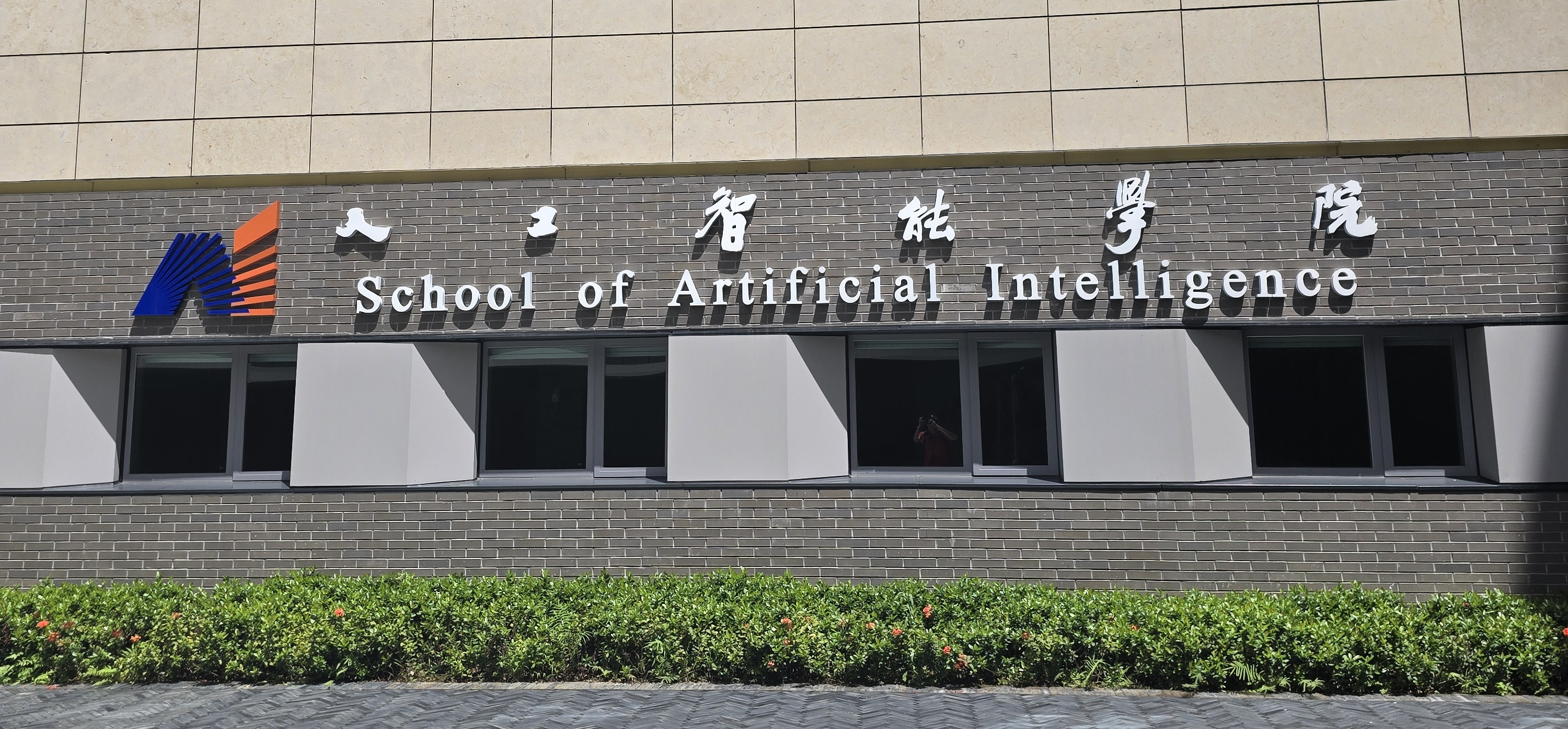
School of Artificial Intelligence

The university is organized as schools each specializing in undergraduate and graduate schools in their respective field. Currently there are 8 schools after the launch of the School of Artificial Intelligence on 17 February 2025.

- School of Management and Economics (established 2014)
- School of Science and Engineering (established 2014)
- School of Humanities and Social Science (established 2014)
- School of Data Science (established 2017)
- School of Music (established 2021)
- School of Medicine (established 2021)
- School of Public Policy (established 2024)
- School of Artificial Intelligence (established 2025)

== School of Management and Economics (SME) ==
The School of Management and Economics (SME) was the first school established at the Chinese University of Hong Kong, Shenzhen, founded in 2014 alongside the university itself. The school holds accreditation from the Association to Advance Collegiate Schools of Business (AACSB), an accreditation held by approximately six percent of business schools worldwide. Instruction is in English, and the curriculum incorporates emerging fields such as artificial intelligence into traditional business disciplines including marketing and finance.

== School of Medicine (MED) ==
CUHK-Shenzhen School of Medicine

The CUHK-Shenzhen School of Medicine, established in August 2021 through a tripartite agreement between the Shenzhen Municipal Government, CUHK, and CUHK-Shenzhen, is a medical school located in Shenzhen, China. The school offers a six-year Clinical Medicine programme taught in English, which upon completion grants the same Bachelor of Medicine degree (医学学士) as other mainland Chinese medical schools and a Bachelor of Science (Clinical Medicine). The programme is currently accepting international medical students. The curriculum is based on the medical programme of the CUHK Hong Kong campus, adapted for the mainland Chinese context. The School of Medicine integrates artificial intelligence education longitudinally across all six years of its clinical medicine programme.

CUHK-Shenzhen Medical Centre

The CUHK-Shenzhen Medical Centre serves as the flagship direct-affiliated teaching hospital of the School of Medicine, located in the Longgang District of Shenzhen. The 3,000-bed comprehensive Grade 3A hospital commenced soft opening in late 2025 and is slated for full completion by the end of 2026, functioning as a key academic health sciences centre for the Greater Bay Area.
