= Southern University of Science and Technology =

Municipal public university in Shenzhen, Guangdong, China

- 南方科技大学
- Former names: South University of Science and Technology of China (2010–2016)
- Motto: 明德求是，日新自强
- Motto in English: Virtue, Truth, Advance
- Type: Public
- Established: 2010; 16 years ago
- Affiliations: GHMUA
- Endowment: ¥486 million (2019)
- Budget: ¥4.15 billion (2020)
- Chairman: Chairperson Guo Yurong
- President: Xue Qikun
- Vice-president: Tang Tao, Lu Chun, Teng Jinguang
- Vice-Chancellor: Vice Chairperson Li Fengliang
- Provost: Tang Tao
- Academic staff: 1,310
- Students: 10,263 (2022)
- Undergraduates: 4,804 (2022)
- Postgraduates: 5,459 (2022)
- Location: Shenzhen, Guangdong, China; 22.600556°N 113.994722°E
- Campus: Urban, 480 acres (194.2 ha)
- Website: sustech.edu.cn

Chinese name
- Simplified Chinese: 南方科技大学
- Traditional Chinese: 南方科技大學
Transcriptions
Standard Mandarin
- Hanyu Pinyin: Nánfāng Kējì Dàxué
Yue: Cantonese
- Jyutping: naam4 fong1 fo1 gei6 daai6 hok6

The Southern University of Science and Technology (SUSTech) is a municipal public university in Shenzhen, Guangdong, China. It is owned and funded by the Shenzhen Municipal People's Government. In 2022, there were over 10,000 students enrolled. The university is part of the Double First-Class Construction.

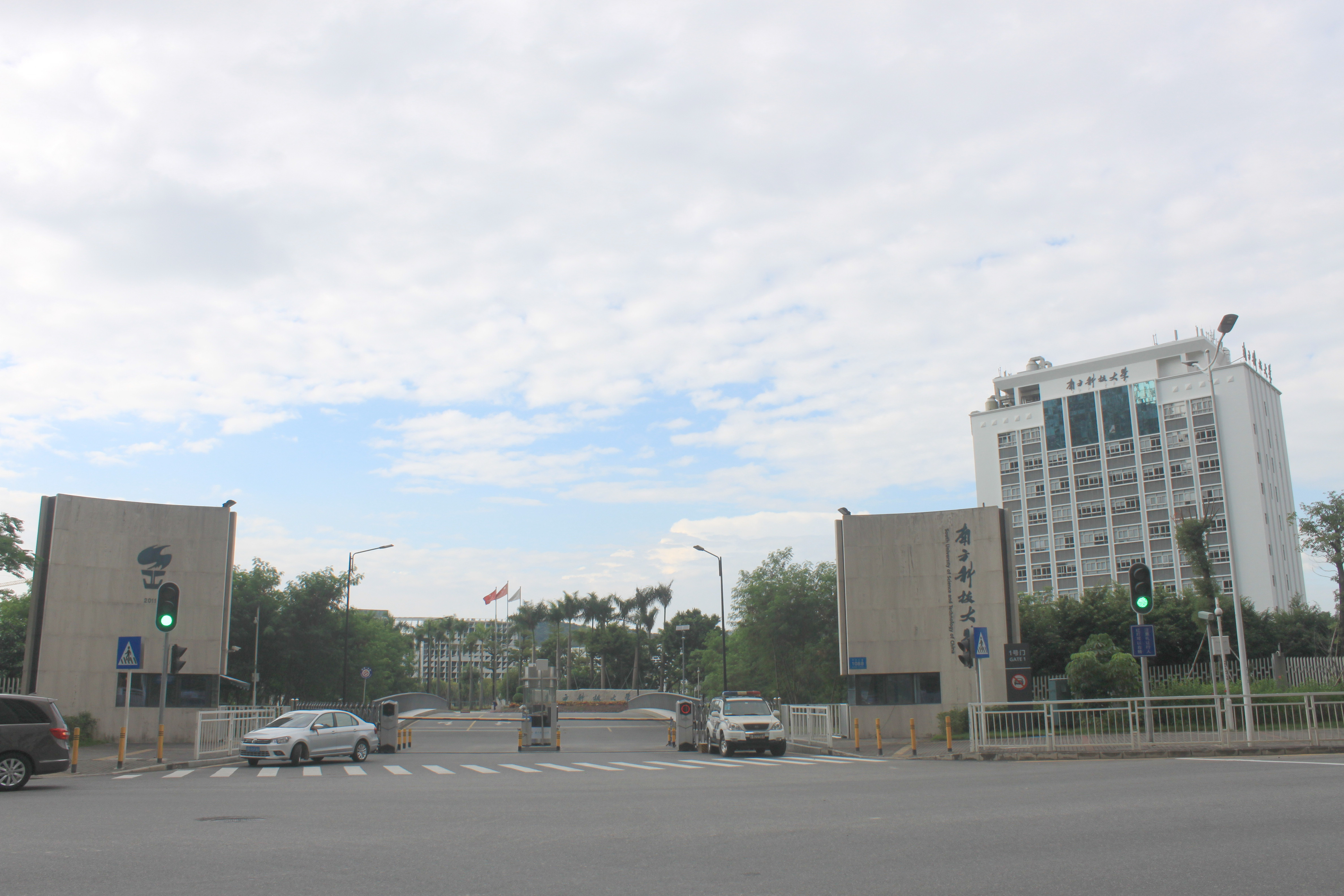
Main Gate of SUSTech

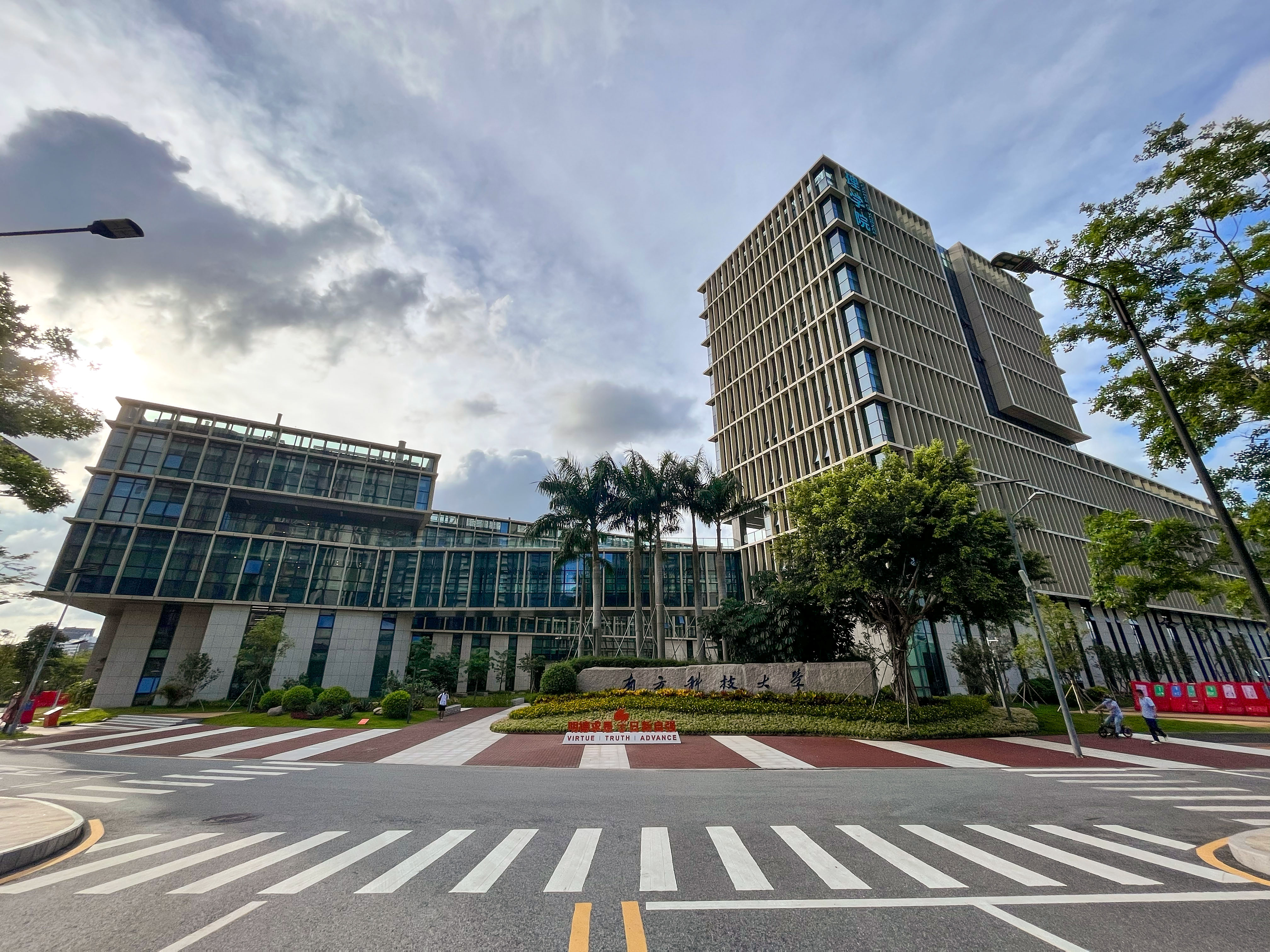
College of Science Building of Southern University of Science and Technology in May 2022

== History ==
SUSTech was established in 2010. As it did not get the permission from Ministry of Education to admit high school graduates that year, it admitted home educated students, and became the second university to help enhance home-grown talent and innovation, as well as to further develop a culture of tertiary education in China. In the following years though, it admits regular high school graduates just like the other universities as it obtained the needed permission.

It is located in the rapidly-growing tech capital city of Shenzhen.

== Location ==
SUSTech is located on a large campus covering an area of 1,978,980 m^{2} in the Nanshan District of Shenzhen. The campus is a mix of modern buildings, streams and tree-lined green spaces. The university is committed to environmental-friendly policies and aims to have zero carbon emissions.

== Rankings and reputation ==
University rankings
BCUR National	Domestic	32
Wu Shulian National	Domestic	67
CUAA National	Alumni	56
QS National	General	20
THE National	General	12
QS Asia (Asia version)	General	107
THE Asia (Asia version)	General	31
ARWU World	Research	101–150
QS World	General	=343
THE World	General	=160
USNWR World	General	119

In the Times Higher Education 2022 survey, it ranked among the Top Ten universities in mainland China. It was ranked 162nd among the universities in the world. It was also ranked 19th in Asia and 13th in the Young University Rankings in 2022.

The Academic Ranking of World Universities, also known as the "Shanghai Ranking", placed SUSTech 101-150th in the world, 19th in Asia, and 11th in China.

In THE Young Universities Rankings 2021, SUSTech was ranked the top young university in China.

In THE Global University Employability Ranking, SUSTech was ranked 158th in 2021.

In QS World University Ranking 2023, SUSTech was ranked 11th in mainland China, 91st in Asia and 226th in the world.

=== Nature Index ===
SUSTech ranked 2nd in the world for Nature Index 2021 Young Universities (Leading 150 Young Universities). It also ranked #22 in the world and #16 in the Asia-Pacific region for Annual Nature Index Table 2025.

Year	Rank	Valuer
2021	2	Nature Index 2021 Young Universities (Leading 150 Young Universities)
2025	16	Nature Index - Academic Institutions - Asia-Pacific
2025	22	Nature Index - Academic Institutions - Global

== Medical School ==
The School of Medicine offers undergraduate programs in Clinical Medicine and Biomedical Sciences. The curriculum combines basic sciences with clinical practice and includes small-class instruction and problem-based learning. The Southern University of Science and Technology (SUSTech) established a joint medical school in Shenzhen with King's College London, officially approved by the Chinese Ministry of Education and launched in 2021. The clinical medicine program allows students to receive a degree from King's College London without requiring any period of study abroad in the United Kingdom, in addition to a Bachelor of Medicine from SUSTech. Under the Medical Training (Prioritisation) Act 2026, SUSTech-KCL graduates are relegated to the international reserve list for UK Foundation Programme as they complete the majority of their training outside the British Isles, though they may be offered remaining positions if the reserve list is not filled after all prioritized applicants have been placed.

== See also ==
- List of universities and colleges in Guangdong
- List of universities in China
- Higher education in China
