= Outline of fluid dynamics =

Aspects of fluid mechanics involving flow of fluids (liquids and gases)

The following outline is provided as an overview of and topical guide to fluid dynamics:

In physics, physical chemistry, and engineering, fluid dynamics is a subdiscipline of fluid mechanics that describes the flow of fluids – liquids and gases. It has several subdisciplines, including aerodynamics (the study of air and other gases in motion) and hydrodynamics (the study of water and other liquids in motion). Fluid dynamics has a wide range of applications, including calculating forces and moments on aircraft, determining the mass flow rate of petroleum through pipelines, predicting weather patterns, understanding nebulae in interstellar space, understanding large scale geophysical flows involving oceans/atmosphere and modelling fission weapon detonation.

Below is a structured list of topics in fluid dynamics.

== What is fluid dynamics? ==
Fluid dynamics can be described as all of the following:

- An academic discipline – one with academic departments, curricula and degrees; national and international societies; and specialized journals.
- A scientific field (a branch of science) – widely recognized category of specialized expertise within science, and typically embodies its own terminology and nomenclature. Such a field will usually be represented by one or more scientific journals, where peer-reviewed research is published.
  - A natural science – one that seeks to elucidate the rules that govern the natural world using empirical and scientific methods.
    - A physical science – one that studies non-living systems.
      - A branch of physics – study of matter, its fundamental constituents, its motion and behavior through space and time, and the related entities of energy and force.
        - A branch of mechanics – area of mathematics and physics concerned with the relationships between force, matter, and motion among physical objects.
          - A branch of continuum mechanics – subject that models matter without using the information that it is made out of atoms; that is, it models matter from a macroscopic viewpoint rather than from microscopic.
            - A subdiscipline of fluid mechanics – branch of physics concerned with the mechanics of fluids (liquids, gases, and plasmas) and the forces on them, which also includes hydrostatics as a subdiscipline
            - A subdiscipline of fluid mechanics – branch of physics concerned with the mechanics of fluids (liquids, gases, and plasmas) and the forces on them.
          - A branch of dynamics (mechanics) – subject that studies forces and motion.

== Branches of fluid dynamics ==
- Acoustic theory – Theory of sound waves
- Aerodynamics – Branch of dynamics concerned with studying the motion of air
- Aeroelasticity – Interactions among inertial, elastic, and aerodynamic forces
- Computational fluid dynamics – Analysis and solving of problems that involve fluid flows
- Flow measurement – Quantification of bulk fluid movement
- Electrohydrodynamics – Study of electrically conducting fluids in the presence of electric fields
- Magnetohydrodynamics – Model of electrically conducting fluids
- Topological fluid dynamics
- Quantum hydrodynamics – Topic in condensed matter physics

== History of fluid dynamics ==
History of fluid dynamics

== Mathematical equations and concepts ==
- Airy wave theory – Fluid dynamics theory on gravity waves
- Benjamin–Bona–Mahony equation – Partial differential equation
- Boussinesq approximation (water waves) – Approximation valid for weakly non-linear and fairly long waves
- Boundary conditions in fluid dynamics – Constraints to computational problems
  - Boundary conditions in computational fluid dynamics
- Elementary flow
- Euler equations (fluid dynamics) – Set of quasilinear hyperbolic equations governing adiabatic and inviscid flow
  - Relativistic Euler equations – Generalization of Euler equations
- Helmholtz's theorems – 3D motion of fluid near vortex lines
- Kirchhoff equations – Motion of rigid body in ideal fluid
- Knudsen equation – Description of gas flow in free molecular flow
- Manning equation – Estimate of velocity in open channel flows
- Mild-slope equation – Physics phenomenon and formula
- Morison equation – Equation for force on an object in sea waves
- Navier–Stokes equations – Equations of motion for viscous fluids
- Oseen flow – Formulae for viscous and incompressible fluid flow at small Reynolds numbers
- Poiseuille's law – Law describing the pressure drop in an incompressible and Newtonian fluid
- Pressure head – In fluid mechanics, the height of a liquid column
- Rayleigh's equation (fluid dynamics) – Theoretical model of shear fluid flow
- Stokes stream function – Function in fluid dynamics
- Stream function – Function for incompressible divergence-free flows in two dimensions
- Streamlines, streaklines and pathlines – Field lines in a fluid flow
- Torricelli's Law – Theorem in fluid mechanics

== Types of fluid flow ==
- Aerodynamic force – Force exerted on a body as it moves through air or gas
- Convection – Fluid flow that occurs due to heterogeneous fluid properties and body forces
- Cavitation – Low-pressure voids formed in liquids
- Compressible flow – Branch of fluid mechanics
- Couette flow – Model of viscous fluid flow between two surfaces moving relative to each other
- Effusive limit
- Free molecular flow – Gas flow with a relatively large mean free molecular path
- Incompressible flow – Fluid flow in which density remains constant
- Inviscid flow – Flow of fluids with zero viscosity (superfluids)
- Isothermal flow – Model of fluid flow
- Lid-driven cavity – Benchmark problem in fluid dynamics
- Open channel flow – Type of liquid flow within a conduit
- Pipe flow – Type of liquid flow within a closed conduit
- Pressure-driven flow
- Secondary flow – Relatively minor flow superimposed on the primary flow by inviscid assumptions
- Stream thrust averaging – Process to convert 3D flow into 1D
- Superfluidity – Fluid which flows without losing kinetic energy
- Taylor–Green vortex – Periodic vortex array in fluid dynamics
- Transient flow – Aspects of fluid mechanics involving fluid flow
- Two-phase flow – Flow of gas and liquid in the same conduit

== Fluid properties ==
- List of hydrodynamic instabilities
- Newtonian fluid – Type of fluid
- Non-Newtonian fluid – Fluid with variable viscosity
- Surface tension – Tendency of a liquid surface to shrink to reduce surface area
- Vapour pressure – Pressure exerted by a vapor in thermodynamic equilibrium

== Fluid phenomena ==
- Balanced flow – Model of atmospheric motion
  - Geostrophic balance – Balance between the pressure gradient and Coriolis forces
- Boundary layer – Layer of fluid in the immediate vicinity of a bounding surface
- Coanda effect – Tendency of a fluid jet to stay attached to a surface of any form
- Convection cell – Cyclic flow of convection currents in a fluid
- Convergence/Bifurcation – Linear map that preserves areas
- Darwin drift
- Drag (force) – Retarding force on a body moving in a fluid
- Droplet vaporization – Phenomenon in fluid dynamics
- Hydrodynamic stability – Subfield of fluid dynamics
- Kaye effect – Property of complex liquids
- Lift (force) – Force perpendicular to flow of surrounding fluid
- Magnus effect – Deflection of a spinning object moving through a fluid
- Ocean current – Directional mass flow of oceanic water
- Ocean surface waves – Surface waves generated by wind on open water
- Rossby wave – Inertial wave in rotating fluids
- Shock wave – Propagating disturbance
- Soliton – Self-reinforcing single wave packet
- Stokes drift – Average velocity of a fluid parcel in a gravity wave
- Teapot effect – Phenomenon in fluid dynamics
- Thread breakup
- Turbulent jet breakup
- Upstream contamination – Contaminants moving opposite of flow
- Venturi effect – Reduced pressure caused by a flow restriction in a tube or pipe
- Vortex – Fluid flow revolving around an axis of rotation
- Water hammer – Pressure surge when a fluid is forced to stop or change direction suddenly
- Wave drag – Component of aerodynamic drag
- Wind – Natural movement of air or other gases relative to a planet's surface

== Concepts in aerodynamics ==
- Aileron – Aircraft control surface used to induce roll
- Airplane – Powered aircraft with wings
- Angle of attack – Angle between the chord of a wing and the undisturbed airflow
- Banked turn – Inclination of road or surface other than flat
- Bernoulli's principle – Principle relating to fluid dynamics
- Bilgeboard – Lifting foil used in a sailboat
- Boomerang – Thrown tool and weapon
- Centerboard – Retractable keel which pivots out of a slot in the hull of a sailboat
- Chord (aircraft) – Imaginary straight line joining the leading and trailing edges of an aerofoil
- Circulation control wing – Aircraft high-lift device
- Currentology – Science that studies the internal movements of water masses
- Diving plane – Control surface on a submarine
- Downforce – Downwards lift force created by the aerodynamic characteristics of a vehicle
- Drag coefficient – Dimensionless parameter to quantify fluid resistance
- Fin – Thin component or appendage attached to a larger body or structure
- Flipper (anatomy) – Flattened limb adapted for propulsion and maneuvering in water
- Flow separation – Detachment of a boundary layer from a surface into a wake
- Foil (fluid mechanics) – Solid object used in fluid mechanics
- Fluid coupling – Device used to transmit rotating mechanical power
- Gas kinetics – Study of the motion of gases
- Hydrofoil – Type of fast watercraft and the name of the technology it uses
- Keel – Lower centreline structural element of a ship or boat hull (hydrodynamic)
- Küssner effect – Concept in aerodynamics
- Kutta condition – Fluid dynamics principle regarding bodies with sharp corners
- Kutta–Joukowski theorem – Formula relating lift on an airfoil to fluid speed, density, and circulation
- Lift coefficient – Dimensionless quantity relating lift to fluid density and velocity over an area
- Lift-induced drag – Type of aerodynamic resistance against the motion of a wing or other airfoil
- Lift-to-drag ratio – Measure of aerodynamic efficiency
- Lifting-line theory – Mathematical model to quantify lift
- NACA airfoil – Wing shape
- Newton's third law – Laws in physics about force and motion
- Propeller – Device that transmits rotational power into linear thrust on a fluid
- Pump – Device that imparts energy to fluids by mechanical action
- Rudder – Control surface for fluid-dynamic steering in the yaw axis
- Sail – Fabric or other surface supported by a mast to allow wind propulsion (aerodynamics)
- Skeg – Extension of a boat's keel at the back, also a surfboard's fin
- Sound barrier – Sudden increase of undesirable effects when an aircraft approaches the speed of sound
- Spoiler (automotive) – Device for reducing aerodynamic drag
- Stall (flight) – Abrupt reduction in lift due to flow separation
- Supersonic flow over a flat plate
- Surfboard fin – Part of a surfboard
- Surface science – Study of physical and chemical phenomena that occur at the interface of two phases
- Torque converter – Fluid coupling that transfers rotating power from a prime mover to a rotating driven load
- Trim tab – Boat or aircraft component
- Wing – Appendage used for flight
- Wingtip vortices – Turbulence caused by difference in air pressure on either side of wing

== Fluid dynamics research ==
- Fluid dynamics journals

=== Methods used in fluid dynamics research ===
- Advection scheme – Numerical method for transport by fluid flow
  - Essentially non-oscillatory scheme – Class of high-resolution schemes in numerical solutions of differential equations
- Finite volume method for unsteady flow – Numerical analysis of fluid dynamics
- Flow visualization – Visualization technique in fluid dynamics
- Immersed boundary method – Method in computational fluid dynamics
- Projection method (fluid dynamics) – Method for numerically solving time-dependent incompressible fluid-flow problems
- Seeding (fluid dynamics)

=== Tools used in fluid dynamics research ===
- Peniche (fluid dynamics)
- Rotating tank – Fluid dynamics

== Applications of fluid dynamics ==
- Acoustics – Branch of physics involving mechanical waves
- Aeronautics – Science of air flight-capable machines
- Astrophysical fluid dynamics – Branch of modern astronomy
- Cryosphere science – Earth's surface where water is frozen
- Geophysical fluid dynamics – Dynamics of naturally occurring flows
- Hemodynamics – Dynamics of blood flow
- Hydraulics – Applied engineering involving liquids
- Hydrology – Science of the movement, distribution, and quality of water on Earth
- Fluidics – Use of a fluid to perform analog or digital operations
- Fluid power – Use of fluids under pressure to generate, control, and transmit power
- Geodynamics – Study of dynamics of the Earth
- Hydraulic machinery – Type of machine that uses liquid fluid power to perform work
- Meteorology – Study of the atmosphere, focusing on weather forecasting
- Naval architecture – Engineering discipline of marine vessels
- Oceanography – Scientific study of the ocean
- Plasma physics – State of matter
- Pneumatics – Use of pressurised gas in mechanical systems
- Ice-sheet dynamics – Large mass of glacial ice

== Fluid dynamics organizations ==
- Von Karman Institute for Fluid Dynamics
- Max Planck Institute for Dynamics and Self-Organization

== Fluid dynamics publications ==
=== Books on fluid dynamics ===
- Publications in fluid dynamics throughout history
- An Album of Fluid Motion (1982)

=== Journals pertaining to fluid dynamics ===
- Annual Review of Fluid Mechanics
- Journal of Fluid Mechanics
- Physics of Fluids
- Physical Review Fluids
- Experiments in Fluids
- European Journal of Mechanics B: Fluids
- Theoretical and Computational Fluid Dynamics
- Computers and Fluids
- International Journal for Numerical Methods in Fluids
- Flow, Turbulence and Combustion

== People in fluid dynamics ==
Contributors to the field of fluid dynamics in turn come from a wide array of fields, and in addition to their other titles, each is also a fluid dynamicist. Following is a list of notable fluid dynamicists:

- Snezhana Abarzhi – Applied mathematician and mathematical physicist
- John Abraham – American professor
- H. Norman Abramson – American engineer (1926–2022)
- David Acheson – British mathematician
- Andreas Acrivos – Greek–American physicist (1928–2025)
- Noreen Sher Akbar – Pakistani applied mathematician
- Silas D. Alben – American mathematician
- Jean le Rond d'Alembert – French mathematician (1717–1783)
- Hannes Alfvén – Swedish physicist and Nobel laureate (1908–1995)
- John D. Anderson – American curator (born 1937)
- Elephter Andronikashvili – Georgian physicist
- Shelley Anna – American chemical engineer
- Archimedes – Greek mathematician and physicist (c. 287 – 212 BC)
- Hassan Aref – Professor of fluid dynamics
- Vladimir Arnold – Russian mathematician (1937–2010)
- Amedeo Avogadro – Italian scientist (1776–1856)
- Ralph Bagnold – British Army officer (1896–1990)
- Boris Bakhmeteff – Russian diplomat (1880–1951)
- Donát Bánki – Hungarian mechanical engineer (1859–1922)
- Grigory Barenblatt – Russian mathematician (1927–2018)
- Dwight Barkley – British researcher
- Adhémar Jean Claude Barré de Saint-Venant – French mathematician (1797–1886)
- Alfred Barnard Basset – British mathematician (1854–1930)
- George Batchelor – Australian mathematician and physicist
- Harry Bateman – British-American mathematician
- Francine Battaglia – American computational fluid dynamicist
- Jurjen Battjes – Dutch civil engineer (born 1939)
- Henri-Émile Bazin – French hydraulic engineer
- James Thomas Beale – American mathematician
- Adrian Bejan – Romanian-American professor
- Josette Bellan – Romanian-French-American fluid dynamicist
- Henri Bénard – French physicist (1874–1939)
- Brooke Benjamin – English mathematical physicist and mathematician
- David Benney – New Zealand applied mathematician
- Frank H. Berkshire – British mathematician
- Natalia Berloff – Russian mathematician
- Daniel Bernoulli – Swiss mathematician and physicist (1700–1782)
- Johann Bernoulli – Swiss mathematician (1667–1748)
- Andrea Bertozzi – American mathematician
- W. H. Besant – British mathematician
- Albert Betz – German physicist (1885–1968)
- Eugene C. Bingham – American chemist (1878–1945)
- Jean-Baptiste Biot – French physicist (1774–1862)
- Robert Byron Bird – American chemical engineer (1924–2020)
- Garrett Birkhoff – American mathematician (1911–1996)
- Paul Richard Heinrich Blasius – German physicist
- Tobias de Boer – Dutch scientist
- Ludwig Boltzmann – Austrian mathematician and theoretical physicist (1844–1906)
- Wilfrid Noel Bond – English physicist (1897–1937)
- Joseph Valentin Boussinesq – French mathematician and physicist (1842–1929)
- Robert Boyle – Anglo-Irish scientist (1627–1691)
- Peter Bradshaw (aeronautical engineer) – British engineer (1935–2024)
- Francis Bretherton – American mathematician, oceanographer and engineer (1935–2021)
- John D. Buckmaster – British aerospace engineer
- Gerald Bull – Canadian artillery engineer and entrepreneur (1928–1990)
- Jan Burgers – Dutch physicist (1895–1981)
- Adolf Busemann – German-American aerospace engineer
- Sébastien Candel – French physicist (born 1946)
- Isabelle Cantat – French physicist
- Silvana Cardoso – Portuguese fluid dynamicist
- Nicolas Léonard Sadi Carnot – French physicist and engineer (1796–1832)
- George F. Carrier – American mathematician
- Claudia Cenedese – Italian oceanographer
- Subrahmanyan Chandrasekhar – Indian-American astrophysicist (1910–1995)
- Hubert Chanson – Australian engineering academic (born 1961)
- Jacques Charles – French inventor, scientist and mathematician (1746–1823)
- Jean-Yves Chemin – French mathematician (born 1959)
- Thomas H. Chilton – American chemical engineer
- Alexandre Chorin – American mathematician (1938–2026)
- Demetrios Christodoulou – Greek mathematician and physicist (born 1951)
- Chia-Kun Chu – Chinese-American mathematician (1927–2023)
- Émile Clapeyron – French engineer and physicist (1799–1864)
- John Frederick Clarke
- Rudolf Clausius – German physicist and mathematician (1822–1888)
- Paul Clavin – French scientist
- Nicolas Clément – French physicist and chemist (1779–1841)
- Julian Cole – American mathematician (1925–1999)
- Adrian Constantin – Romanian-Austrian mathematician
- Stanley Corrsin – American physicist and engineer
- Maurice Couette – French physicist
- Richard Courant – German-American mathematician (1888–1972)
- David Crighton – British mathematician and physicist (1942–2000)
- Mimi Dai – Mathematician
- Stuart Dalziel – British and New Zealand fluid dynamicist
- Gerhard Damköhler – German chemist (1908–1944)
- Henry Darcy – French engineer (1803–1858)
- Georges Jean Marie Darrieus – French aerospace and electrical engineer
- Stephen H. Davis – American mathematician (1939–2021)
- William Reginald Dean – British mathematician (1896–1973)
- Lokenath Debnath – Indian American mathematician (1935–2023)
- Subhasish Dey – Indian hydraulician and educator
- Satish Dhawan – Indian mathematician and engineer (1920–2002)
- Rudolf Diesel – German inventor and engineer (1858–1913)
- Ronald DiPerna – American mathematician
- Charles R. Doering – American mathematician (1956–2021)
- David Dolidze – Georgian and Soviet mathematician
- Philip Drazin – British mathematician (1934–2002)
- Hugh Latimer Dryden – American aeronautical scientist and civil servant (1898–1965)
- Elizabeth B. Dussan V. – American mathematician
- Ernst R. G. Eckert
- Vagn Walfrid Ekman – Swedish oceanographer (1874–1954)
- Simen Ådnøy Ellingsen – Norwegian Professor
- Loránd Eötvös – Hungarian physicist (1848–1919)
- Jerald Ericksen – American mathematician (1924–2021)
- R. Cengiz Ertekin – Turkish marine engineer
- Leonhard Euler – Swiss mathematician (1707–1783)
- David Evans (mathematician) – British mathematician (1940–2026)
- Amir Faghri – American mechanical engineering professor (born 1951)
- Gino Girolamo Fanno – Italian mechanical engineer (1882–1962)
- Eduard Feireisl – Czech mathematician
- Antonio Ferri – Italian scientist (1912–1975)
- John Ffowcs Williams – British engineer-scientist (1935–2020)
- Bruce A. Finlayson
- Irmgard Flügge-Lotz – German-American mathematician and aerospace engineer
- Emanuele Foà – Italian engineer and physicist (1892–1949)
- Hermann Föttinger – German engineer (1877–1945)
- Joseph Fourier – French mathematician and physicist (1768–1830)
- James B. Francis – British-American civil engineer (1815–1892)
- David A. Frank-Kamenetskii – Soviet scientist (1910–1970)
- François Frenkiel
- Uriel Frisch – French mathematical physicist
- Robert Edmund Froude – British engineer and naval architect
- William Froude – British engineer and naval architect
- Mohamed Gad-el-Hak – Professor of Biomedical Engineering
- Joseph Louis Gay-Lussac – French chemist and physicist (1778–1850)
- Israel Gelfand – Soviet mathematician (1913–2009)
- William K. George – American fluid dynamicist
- Morteza Gharib
- Alan Jeffrey Giacomin – Canadian professor of chemical engineering
- Josiah Willard Gibbs – American scientist (1839–1903)
- Adrian Gill (meteorologist) – Australian meteorologist
- Pierre-Simon Girard – French mathematician and engineer (1765–1836)
- Hermann Glauert – British aerodynamicist (1892-1934)
- James Glimm – American mathematician
- Sergei Godunov – Russian mathematician (1929–2023)
- Sydney Goldstein – British mathematician (1903–1989)
- Alexander Gorlov – Russian-American scientist and inventor (1931–2016)
- Leo Graetz – German physicist
- Franz Grashof – German engineer (1826–1893)
- Albert E. Green – British mathematician
- Harvey P. Greenspan – American mathematician (1933–2026)
- Marina Guenza – Italian chemist
- Max Gunzburger – American mathematician
- Wolfgang Haack – German mathematician (1902–1994)
- Gotthilf Hagen – German physicist
- Georg Hamel – German mathematician (1877 - 1954)
- Thomas Henry Havelock – English mathematician
- Wallace D. Hayes
- Peter H. Haynes – British mathematician
- Werner Heisenberg – German physicist (1901–1976)
- Henry Selby Hele-Shaw – British engineer (1854–1941)
- Hermann von Helmholtz – German physicist and physiologist (1821–1894)
- John Hinch (mathematician)
- Julius Oscar Hinze – Dutch scientist (1907–1993)
- Hans G. Hornung
- Leslie Howarth – British mathematician
- Pierre Henri Hugoniot – French scientist (1851–1887)
- Herbert Huppert – British geophysicist (born 1943)
- Fazle Hussain – American physicist
- M. Yousuff Hussaini
- Caius Iacob – Romanian mathematician and politician
- Antony Jameson – British aerospace engineer (1934–2026)
- James Jeans – English physicist, astronomer, and mathematician (1877–1946)
- George Barker Jeffery – British mathematical physicist (1891–1957)
- Daniel D. Joseph – American mechanical engineer
- James Prescott Joule – English physicist (1818–1889)
- Viktor Kaplan – Austrian engineer
- Béla Karlovitz – Hungarian-American engineer, inventor
- Theodore von Kármán – Hungarian-American mathematician, aerospace engineer and physicist (1881–1963)
- Lord Kelvin – British physicist, engineer and mathematician (1824–1907)
- Earle Hesse Kennard – US theoretical physicist (1885–1968)
- Gustav Kirchhoff – German physicist and mathematician (1824–1887)
- Alexander Kiselev (mathematician) – American mathematician
- Martin Knudsen – Danish physicist
- Andrey Kolmogorov – Soviet mathematician (1903–1987)
- Ludwig Kort
- Diederik Korteweg – Dutch mathematician (1848–1941)
- Leslie Stephen George Kovasznay – Hungarian-American engineer
- Robert Kraichnan – American theoretical physicist (1928–2008)
- Martin Kutta – German mathematician (1867–1944)
- Olga Ladyzhenskaya – Russian mathematician (1922–2004)
- Paco Lagerstrom – Swedish American mathematician
- Horace Lamb – English mathematician (1849–1934)
- Lev Landau – Soviet theoretical physicist (1908–1968)
- Pierre-Simon Laplace – French polymath (1749–1827)
- Boris Laschka – German fluid dynamics scientist and aeronautical engineer
- Brian Launder – British academic
- Gustaf de Laval – Swedish engineer and inventor (1845–1913)
- Chung K. Law – Engineering researcher
- Peter Lax – Hungarian-born American mathematician (1926–2025)
- L. Gary Leal – American chemical engineer and academic
- Leonid Leibenson – Soviet physicist (1879–1951)
- Leonardo da Vinci – Italian polymath (1452–1519)
- Tullio Levi-Civita – Italian mathematician (1873–1941)
- Veniamin Levich – Ukrainian physicist (1917–1988)
- Bernard Lewis (scientist)
- Warren K. Lewis – American chemical engineer (1882–1975)
- Paul A. Libby – American scientist (1921–2021)
- Wolfgang Liebe – German aeronautical engineer (1911–2005)
- Hans W. Liepmann – American engineer and academic (1914–2009)
- Evgeny Lifshitz – Soviet physicist (1915–1985)
- Edwin N. Lightfoot – American chemical engineer
- James Lighthill – British applied mathematician (1924–1998)
- Chia-Chiao Lin – Chinese-born American mathematician
- Amable Liñán – Spanish aeronautical engineer (1934–2025)
- Paul Linden – British mathematician
- Anke Lindner – German physicist
- Michael S. Longuet-Higgins – British Mathematician
- Lu Shijia – Chinese physicist
- Geoffrey S. S. Ludford – American scientist (1921–2021)
- John L. Lumley
- Thomas S. Lundgren – American fluid dynamicist (born 1935)
- Ernst Mach – Austrian physicist, philosopher and university educator (1838–1916)
- Charles L. Mader – American physical chemist
- Andrew Majda – American mathematician (1949–2021)
- Carlo Marangoni – Italian physicist (1840–1925)
- Frank E. Marble – American scientist
- Moshe Matalon (engineer) – Israeli-American engineer and mathematician (born 1949)
- Tony Maxworthy – British-American physicist (1933–2013)
- John B. McCormick – American mechanical engineer (1834–1924)
- Trevor McDougall – Oceanographer
- Beverley McKeon – Physicist and aerospace engineer
- Chiang C. Mei – Taiwanese-American physicist (1935–2026)
- Charles Meneveau – French-Chilean born American fluid dynamicist
- Theodor Meyer – German physicist (1882–1972)
- Anthony Michell – Australian mechanical engineer
- John W. Miles – American research professor of applied mechanics and geophysics
- Laura Miller (mathematical biologist) – American mathematical biologist
- L. M. Milne-Thomson – English applied mathematician
- Richard von Mises – Austrian physicist and mathematician (1883–1953)
- Keith Moffatt – British mathematician and physicist
- Parviz Moin – American engineer
- Andrei Monin – Soviet-Russian physicist, mathematician, and oceanographer (1921–2007)
- Lewis Ferry Moody – American engineer and professor
- Rose Morton – American mathematician
- Samar Mubarakmand – Pakistani nuclear physicist (born 1942)
- Walter Munk – American oceanographer (1917–2019)
- Morris Muskat – American petroleum engineer
- Roddam Narasimha – Indian scientist (1933–2020)
- Claude-Louis Navier – French engineer and physicist (1785–1836)
- Paul Neményi – Hungarian mathematician and physicist (1895–1952)
- John von Neumann – Hungarian and American mathematician and physicist (1903–1957)
- Isaac Newton – English polymath (1642–1727)
- Nhan Phan-Thien
- Wilhelm Nusselt – German mechanical engineer and professor (1882–1957)
- Morrough Parker O'Brien – American hydraulic engineering professor (1902–1988)
- John Ockendon
- Hisashi Okamoto – Japanese mathematician
- Steven Orszag – American mathematician (1943–2011)
- Carl Wilhelm Oseen – Swedish theoretical physicist (1879–1944)
- Simon Ostrach – American mathematician and engineer (1923-2017)
- Mariolina Padula – Italian mathematical physicist
- Stoycho Panchev – Bulgarian meteorologist and fluid dynamicist
- Blaise Pascal – French polymath (1623–1662)
- Jean Claude Eugène Péclet – French physicist (1793–1857)
- Tim Pedley – British mathematician (born 1942)
- Joseph Pedlosky – American physical oceanographer (born 1938)
- Lester Allan Pelton – American mechanical engineer
- Stanford S. Penner
- Howell Peregrine – British mathematician
- Adriana Pesci – Argentine mathematician and physicist
- Charles S. Peskin – American mathematician
- Norbert Peters (engineer) – German combustion engineer (1942–2015)
- Henri Pitot – French hydraulic engineer (1695–1771)
- Joseph Plateau – Belgian physicist (1801–1883)
- Milton S. Plesset – American physicist (1908–1991)
- Henri Poincaré – French mathematician, physicist and engineer (1854–1912)
- Jean Léonard Marie Poiseuille – French physicist and physiologist (1797–1869)
- Siméon Denis Poisson – French mathematician and physicist (1781–1840)
- Stephen B. Pope – Cornell University professor of mechanical engineering
- Constantine Pozrikidis – American chemical engineer
- Ludwig Prandtl – German physicist (1875–1953)
- Ronald F. Probstein – American engineer (1928–2021)
- Andrea Prosperetti
- Joseph Proudman – British mathematician and oceanographer
- Seth Putterman – American physicist
- William Rankine – Scottish mechanical engineer (1820–1872)
- John William Strutt, 3rd Baron Rayleigh – British physicist (1842–1919)
- Theodor Rehbock
- Markus Reiner – Israeli scientist and engineer
- Osborne Reynolds – Anglo-Irish innovator (1842–1912)
- William Craig Reynolds
- Dimitri Riabouchinsky – Russian physicist (1882–1962)
- Lewis Fry Richardson – English meteorologist and mathematician (1881–1953)
- Robert D. Richtmyer – American mathematician
- Norman Riley (professor) – British mathematician
- Petre Roman – Prime Minister of Romania between 1989 and 1991
- Louis Rosenhead – British mathematician
- Anatol Roshko – Canadian-American physicist and engineer (1923–2017)
- Carl-Gustaf Rossby – Swedish-born American meteorologist
- Hunter Rouse – American physicist
- John Scott Russell – Naval engineer
- Philip Saffman – British mathematician (1931–2008)
- Stephen Salter – South African-born Scottish academic and inventor
- Ralph Allan Sampson – British astronomer
- Hermann Schlichting – German fluid dynamics engineer
- James Serrin – American mathematician
- Tasneem M. Shah – Pakistani scientist and mathematician
- P. N. Shankar – Indian scientist (1944–2019)
- Ascher H. Shapiro – American engineering professor (1916–2004)
- Beverley Shenstone – Canadian aerodynamicist (1906–1979)
- Thomas Kilgore Sherwood – American chemical engineer
- Albert F. Shields – American engineer
- Max Shiffman – American mathematician
- Wei Shyy – Chinese areospace engineer (born 1955)
- Gregory Sivashinsky
- Apollo M. O. Smith – American aerospace engineer (1911–1997)
- Frank T. Smith – English applied mathematician
- Arnold Sommerfeld – German theoretical physicist (1868–1951)
- Andrew Soward – British fluid dynamicist
- Brian Spalding
- Ephraim M. Sparrow – American academic
- Charles Speziale – American scientist (1948–1999)
- Herbert Squire – British aerospace engineer (1909–1961)
- K. R. Sreenivasan – Indian-American scientist and physicist
- Paul H. Steen – American engineer
- Josef Stefan – Carinthian Slovene physicist (1835–1893)
- Keith Stewartson – British mathematician (1925–1983)
- Sir George Stokes, 1st Baronet – British mathematician and physicist (1819–1903)
- Yvonne Stokes – Australian mathematician
- Howard A. Stone – American engineer (born 1960)
- Vincenc Strouhal – Czech physicist
- John Trevor Stuart – British mathematician (1929–2023)
- G. I. Taylor – British physicist and mathematician (1886–1975)
- Roger Temam – French mathematician
- Hendrik Tennekes – Dutch scientist (1936–2021)
- Walter Tollmien – German fluid dynamicist
- Albert Alan Townsend – Fluid dynamics physicist
- David Tritton – English physicist (1935–1998)
- Viktor Trkal – Czech physicist (1888–1956)
- Clifford Truesdell – American mathematician (1919–2000)
- Gretar Tryggvason – American fluid dynamicist (born 1956)
- Ernie Tuck – Australian mathematician
- Laurette Tuckerman – American mathematical physicist
- Stewart Turner – Australian geophysicist (1930–2022)
- Fritz Ursell – British mathematician (1923–2012)
- Victor Vâlcovici – Romanian mechanician and mathematician
- Milton Van Dyke
- Henri Villat – French mathematician
- Ricardo Vinuesa
- Gustav de Vries – Dutch mathematician (1866–1934)
- John V. Wehausen – American applied mathematician
- Julius Weisbach – German mathematician and engineer (1806–1871)
- Karl Weissenberg – Austrian mathematician and physicist
- Richard T. Whitcomb – American aeronautical engineer (1921–2009)
- Frank M. White – American mechanical engineer (1933–2022)
- Gerald B. Whitham – American mathematician (1927–2014)
- Forman A. Williams – American academic
- John R. Womersley – British mathematician, computer scientist and biophysicist
- Theodore Y. Wu – American engineer (1924–2023)
- Akiva Yaglom – Russian physicist, mathematician, statistician, and meteorologist
- Chia-Shun Yih
- Z. Jane Wang – Chinese and American physicist
- Yakov Zeldovich – Soviet physicist, physical chemist and cosmologist (1914–1987)
- Yuwen Zhang – Chinese-American academic
- Nikolay Zhukovsky (scientist) – Russian scientist (1847–1921)

== Miscellaneous concepts ==
These topics need placement in the sections above, or in new sections.

- Beta plane – Approximation whereby the Coriolis parameter, f, is set to vary linearly in space
- f-plane – Approximation in geophysical fluid dynamics
- Bridge scour – Erosion of sediment near bridge foundations by water
- Isosurface – Surface representing points of constant value within a volume
- Keulegan–Carpenter number – Dimensionless quantity used in fluid dynamics
- Entrance length (fluid dynamics) – Distance a flow travels after entering a pipe before fully developed
- Modon (fluid dynamics) – Sea eddies
- Shock (fluid dynamics)
- Eddy (fluid dynamics) – Swirling and reverse current in a turbulent flow regime
- Non ideal compressible fluid dynamics
- Plume (fluid dynamics) – Column of one fluid moving through another
- Stall (fluid dynamics) – Abrupt reduction in lift due to flow separation
