= Helen Reed =

Helen Reed may refer to:

- Helen Reed-Rowe (born 1949), American career diplomat
- Helen L. Reed (born 1956), American aerospace engineer
- Helen Leah Reed (1861/62–1926), Canadian-born American writer

== See also ==
- Helen Shedd Reed House, a historic house in Lake Forest, Illinois, U.S.
- Helen Reid (disambiguation)
