= Ronald Yeung =

Ronald Yeung may refer to:

- Ronald Yeung (cyclist), Hong Kong cyclist
- Ronald W. Yeung, professor of engineering
