= Hinze =

Hinze is a German surname. Notable people with the surname include:

- Andreas Hinze (born 1959), German footballer
- Chris Hinze (born 1938), Dutch jazz musician
- Emma Hinze (born 1997), German racing cyclist
- Gottfried Hinze (1873-1953), German businessman, athlete, and football administrator
- Julius Oscar Hinze (1907-1993), Dutch scientist specialized in fluid dynamics
- Kerstin Hinze, German rower
- Kristy Hinze (born 1979), Australian model, actress and television host
- Maria Hinze (born 1981), German visual artist
- Mats Hinze (born 1970), Swedish anarchist
- Matthias Hinze (1969–2007), German actor and voice actor
- Nate Hinze (born 1988), American wheelchair basketball player
- Petra Hinze (born 1955), East German cross-country skier
- Russ Hinze (1919–1991), Australian politician

== See also ==
- Hinze Dam, a dam in Queensland, Australia
- Heinz (disambiguation)
