= Giacomin =

Giacomin is a surname. Notable people with the surname include:

- Alan Jeffrey Giacomin (born 1959), Canadian chemical engineer
- Eddie Giacomin (1939–2025), Canadian ice hockey player
