= R. Cengiz Ertekin =

Turkish marine engineer

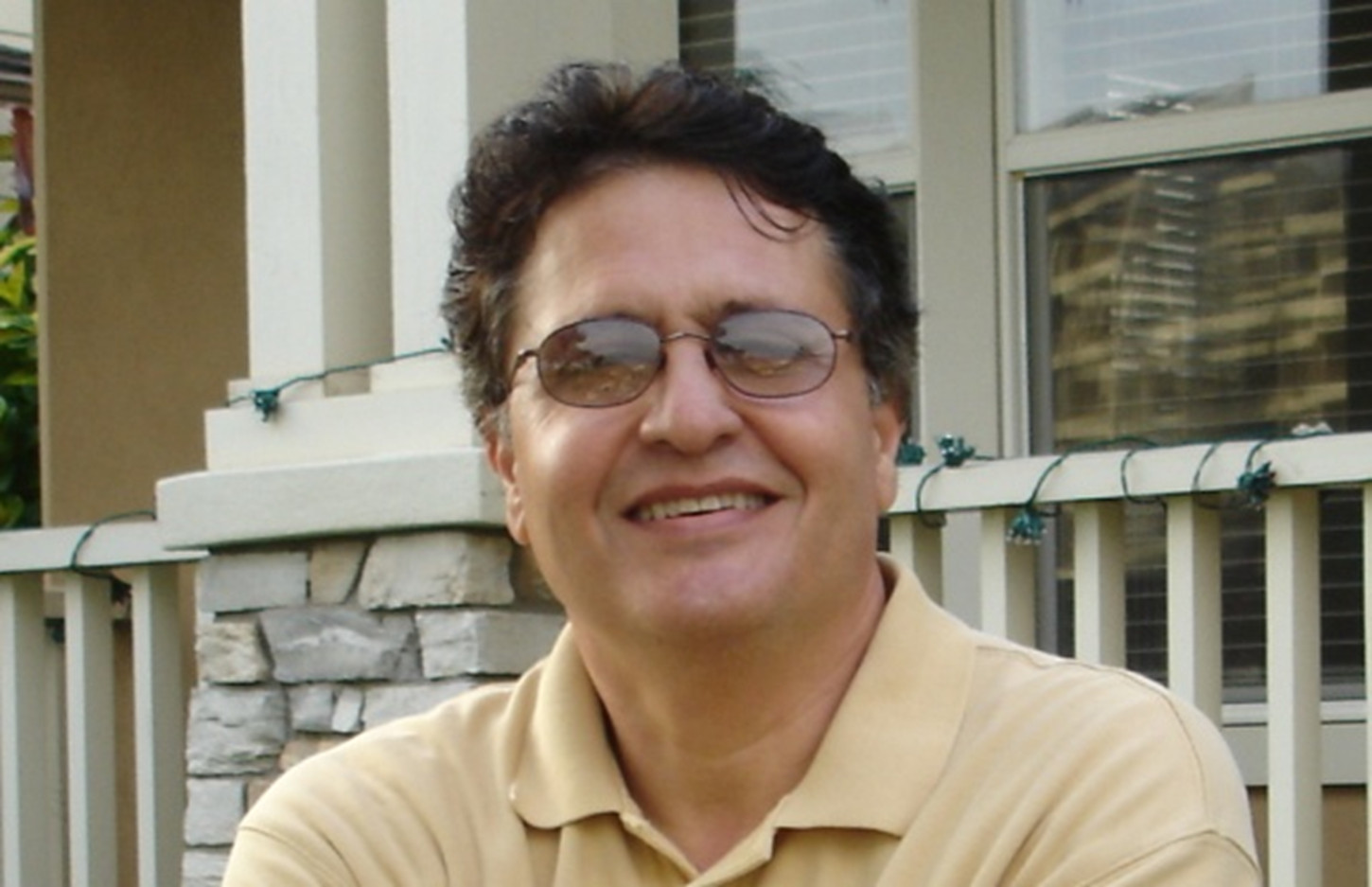
- Born: November 1954; Turgutlu, Manisa, Turkey
- Education: Technical University of Istanbul and University of California, Berkeley
- Known for: The GN equations, Hydroelasticity of VLFS, Wave loads on coastal bridges
- Scientific career
- Fields: Marine Hydrodynamics and Ocean Engineering
- Workplaces: University of Hawaiʻi at Mānoa, United States; Harbin Engineering University of China
- Doctoral advisor: John V. Wehausen

R. Cengiz Ertekin is a professor of Marine Hydrodynamics and Ocean Engineering. He currently holds a guest professor position at Harbin Engineering University of China. He is best known for his contributions to the development of nonlinear water wave theories, hydroelasticity of very large floating structures (VLFS), wave energy, and tsunami and storm impact on coastal bridges. He is also the co-developer, along with Professor H. Ronald Riggs of the University of Hawaiʻi, of the computer program HYDRAN for solving linear fluid-structure interaction problems of floating and fixed bodies.

== Early life and education ==
R. Cengiz Ertekin was born and raised in Turkey. He received a B.Sc. degree in Naval Architecture and Marine Engineering from Istanbul Technical University, the top technical university of Turkey, in 1977. Following the encouragement of his advisor, Prof. M Cengiz Dokmeci, he moved to the Department of Naval Architecture and Offshore Engineering of the University of California, Berkeley, United States, for higher education. He received his M.Sc. and Ph.D. degrees in 1980 and 1984, respectively. His M.Sc. advisors were Professors Marshall P. Tulin and William C. Webster. His Ph.D. advisor was Professor John V. Wehausen. Cengiz was the last student of Prof. John V. Wehausen before his retirement. After graduation, Professor Wehausen offered Cengiz a postdoctoral research assistant position for 18 months at U.C. Berkeley.

== Professional career ==
Most of Ertekin's professional career has been dedicated to academic work; however, he also has several years of experience of working in the industry.

In 1985, Ertekin joined the Research Center of Shell Development Company in Houston, Texas. He took a faculty position (hired at the associate professor level) at the Department of Ocean Engineering of the University of Hawaiʻi at Mānoa in 1986, and received tenure within four years and was promoted to Professor in 1994. The Ocean Engineering Department of UH was established by Professor Charles Bretschneider in 1966 and is one of the first of its kind in the US.

At the University of Hawaiʻi, Ertekin led and contributed immensely to the success of School of Ocean and Earth Science and Technology and the Department of Ocean and Resources Engineering (ORE, formerly Ocean Engineering). In the era of PCs, for example, Professor Ertekin played a key role in transferring the department from one focusing mostly on field and experimental studies, to also a leading institute in modern and computational hydrodynamics. The department was the host of some of the internationally leading conferences, workshops and meetings (details given below), mostly organized and chaired by Cengiz.

After almost 30 years, he retired from the University of Hawaiʻi in September 2015. Starting in March 2014, he became a guest professor at the College of Shipbuilding Engineering of Harbin Engineering University in China.

=== Teaching and advising ===
Ertekin has taught numerous courses on hydrodynamics and ocean engineering at the University of Hawaiʻi at Mānoa, and at University of California, Berkeley.

At the Ocean Engineering Department of the University of Hawaiʻi, Ertekin developed and taught several courses including Nonlinear water wave theories (ORE 707), Hydrodynamics of Fluid-Body Interaction (ORE 609), Buoyancy and Stability (ORE 411), and Marine Renewable Energy (ORE 677), to name a few. At the University of California, Berkeley, he taught Ship Statics (NAOE 151) and Ship Resistance and Propulsion (NAOE 152A).

At the University of Hawaiʻi, Ertekin advised and mentored over 50 graduate students.

=== Research ===
Ertekin's research on Marine Hydrodynamics and Ocean Engineering has extended over a period of about forty years. His work cover both basic and applied research through analytical, computational and experimental approaches. Below are an examples of his pioneering contributions. Other topics of significant research contribution by Ertekin include ship resistance, marine energy, and oil spills.

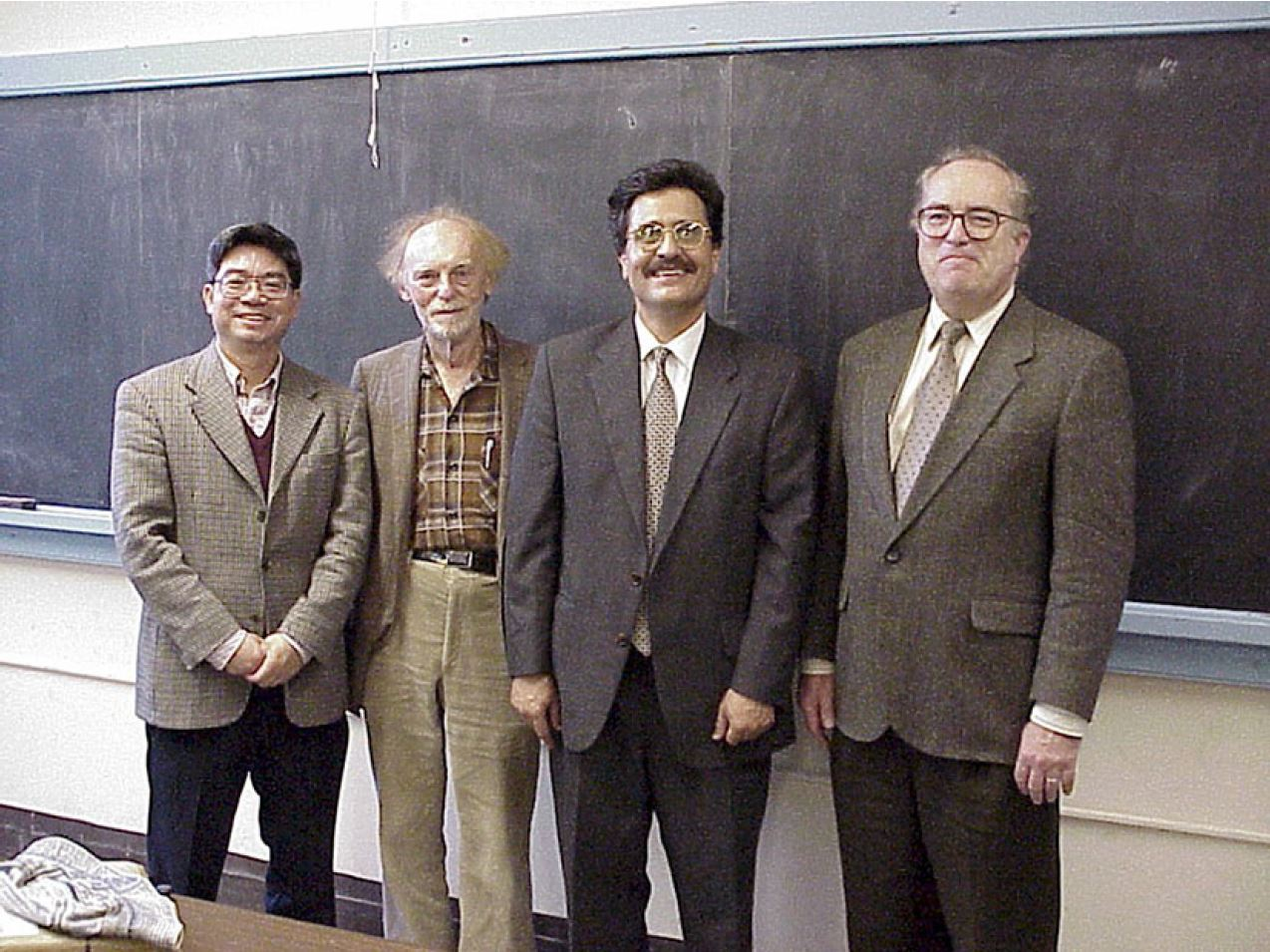
From left Ronald W. Yeung, John V. Wehausen, R. Cengiz Ertekin and William C. Webster. The three of them were Ph.D. students of John V. Wehausen at different times. Webster was Ertekin's M.Sc. co-advisor, and also served on his Ph.D. dissertation committee. Picture taken in April 1999 at U.C. Berkeley.

==== The Green-Naghdi water wave theory ====
The Green-Naghdi (GN) equations are nonlinear water wave equations that were originally developed by British mathematician Albert E. Green and Iranian-American mechanical engineer Paul M. Naghdi in the 1970s (see,). The original equations, namely the Level I GN equations, are mostly applicable to the propagation of long waves in shallow waters. However, high level GN equations are also developed which are applicable to deep water waves. The equations differ from the classical water wave theories (e.g. Boussinesq equations) in that the flow need not be irrotational, and that no perturbation is used in deriving the equations. Hence, the GN equations satisfy the nonlinear boundary conditions exactly, and postulate the integrated conservation laws. Although the GN equations were developed very recently (compared to other wave theories), they are well-known and fairly understood by the research and scientific community.

Ertekin's Ph.D. advisor and dissertation committee chair was Professor Wehausen. Others on his Ph.D. committee were Professor William Webster, and Professor Paul M. Naghdi. Working under close guidance of his advisors, he was one of the first to use the nonlinear equations (that were introduced just a couple of years earlier by Profs. Green and Naghdi). In his Ph.D. dissertation, Ertekin was the first to give the equations in now a familiar form to the hydrodynamics community by providing closed-form relations for the pressures. He named the equations, The Green-Naghdi Equations.

Upon completion of his Ph.D., Ertekin continued research on the GN equations. He has patiently introduced the GN equations to his graduate students and postdoctoral researchers and has guided many of them to perform basic and applied research on or by use of the GN equations. Along with his research assistant and postdocs, they developed the Irrotational GN (IGN) equations (see e.g., and), and high-level GN equations (see e.g., and). They have solved some of the classical and challenging hydrodynamics problems by use of the GN equations, including nonlinear wave diffraction and refraction(see e.g.), nonlinear wave loads on vertical cylinders (see e.g.), wave interaction with elastic bodies and VLFS (see e.g.), wave loads on coastal bridges (see e.g.), and wave interaction with wave energy devices (see e.g.), among many others.

==== Hydroelasticity and VLFS ====
The Mobile Offshore Base (MOB) project of USA and the Mega-Float project of Japan are two examples of Very Large Floating Structures (VLFS). These are very large floating platforms consist of interconnected modules whose length can extend to several kilometers. Due to the unprecedented long length, displacement and associated hydroelastic response of VLFS, the state of the art analysis and design approaches that was used for smaller floating platforms was not adequate. It quickly became obvious that new approaches must be developed to tackle the complex problems associated to dynamics and response of VLFS.

Starting 1990's, Ertekin pioneered the research on hydroelasticity of VLFS. He and H. Ronald Riggs of the Civil Engineering Department at the University of Hawaii coined the term VLFS. They have solved the hydroelasticity problem of VLFS by use of both linear and nonlinear approaches, in two and three dimensions. Ertekin has also introduced new approaches and equations to study this topic, including the use of nonlinear water wave models to analyse the hydroelastic response of VLFS of mat type (see e.g., and).

His work and research on hydroelasticity of VLFS has opened a new era for these topics and gave more confidence in understanding the dynamics and response of the structures.

==== Wave loads on coastal bridges ====
Some of the recent tsunami and hurricanes, such as Tohoku tsunami in Japan (2011) and Hurricane Katrina in the United States (2005), caused significant damage to the decks of coastal bridges and structures. Interaction of surface waves with coastal bridges is a complex problem, involving fluid-structure interaction, multi-phase fluids, wave breaking, and overtopping. These are of course in addition to the difficulties associated to the structural analysis. Ertekin and his students studied bridge failure mechanisms and possible mitigating solutions. They developed models used to assess the vulnerability of coastal bridges in USA to tsunami and storm surge and waves.

=== Publications and professional services ===
Ertekin has over 150 peer-reviewed publications.

He has been on the editorial board of more than ten internationally leading journals since early 1990s (see e.g., and), and editor of several special issues in various journals, see e.g. Renewable Energy: Leveraging Ocean and Waterways special issue of Applied Ocean Research journal (2009). He was the co-editor-in-chief of Elsevier's Ocean Engineering journal (2006–2010), and he is the founding editor-in-chief of Springer's Journal of Ocean Engineering and Marine Energy. Ertekin has been keynote speaker of several leading meetings and conferences, see e.g. and.
