= Frenkiel =

Frenkiel is a surname. Notable people with the surname include:

- François Frenkiel (1910–1986), American physicist
- Stanisław Frenkiel (1918-2001), Polish artist and British art administrator and teacher
- Paweł Frenkiel (1920–1943), Polish Army officer and Jewish youth leader
- Richard H. Frenkiel (born 1943), American engineer

== See also ==
- Frenkel
