= Michael D. Graham =

Engineering academic

Michael D Graham

Academic background
- Education: BS University of Dayton, PhD, Chemical Engineering, Cornell University
- Thesis: (1986)

Academic work
- Institutions: University of Wisconsin–Madison
- Website: https://grahamgroup.che.wisc.edu/

Michael D. (Mike) Graham is the Steenbock Professor of Engineering and Vilas Distinguished Achievement Professor of Chemical and Biological Engineering at the University of Wisconsin–Madison. He is currently serving as the interim associate vice chancellor for research in the physical sciences and has an affiliate appointment in the Department of Mechanical Engineering.

== Early life and education ==
Graham grew up near Dayton, Ohio where he attended the University of Dayton and received his bachelor’s degree in chemical engineering in 1986. He then went to Cornell University and received his Ph.D. in 1991 in chemical engineering under the direction of Professor Paul H. Steen, studying the chaotic dynamics of buoyancy-driven convection in porous media.

Afterwards, he took two postdoctoral positions working on thermal and chemical waves on catalyst surfaces and applications of model reduction techniques to complex spatiotemporal data. The first was with Professor Dan Luss at the University of Houston, and the second with Professor Yannis Kevrekidis at Princeton.

== Career ==
Graham joined the faculty at the Department of Chemical and Biological Engineering at the University of Wisconsin-Madison in 1994, was promoted to associate professor in 1999, and became professor in 2004. He was chair of the department from 2006-2009.

Graham's research focuses broadly on using theory and computations to study problems in fluid dynamics, rheology and transport phenomena, spanning from microscopic to turbulent scales. His group’s research is divided into two primary areas. The first is the dynamics of microscale flows and complex fluids, which includes studying the movement and deformation of suspended objects like blood cells, bacterial, and deformable particles, and the rheology of micellar surfactant solutions. The second area is the nonlinear dynamics of turbulent flows, where they use dynamical systems theory and machine learning to understand and potentially control phenomena like turbulent drag reduction in polymer and surfactant solutions, and gain a broader understanding of wall turbulence and its control. This dual focus bridges the interaction between microstructure, rheology, and complex fluid dynamics with the broader principles of turbulent flow behavior.

As an assistant professor, he received the National Science Foundation CAREER Award in 1995. Additionally, he won 3M's Nontenured Faculty Award in 1997. As an associate professor, he received the Vilas Associate Award in the Physical Sciences from UW-Madison and the Francois Naftali Frenkiel Award for Fluid Mechanics of the American Physical Society (APS). As a full professor, he received the Harvey D. Spangler Professorship in 2005 and in 2011, he was inducted as a fellow into APS.

Graham received the Kellett Mid-Career award from the Wisconsin Alumni Research Foundation in 2014 for his diverse contributions to understanding flowing complex and biological fluids. Also in 2014, Graham was appointed the Vilas Distinguished Achievement Professor of Chemical and Biological Engineering.

In 2015, Graham received the Stanley Corrsin Award from APS Division of Fluid Dynamics in 2015 for research that pioneered the nonlinear dynamics of complex and multiphase fluids, including studies on polymer-turbulence interaction and the microhydrodynamics of complex and biological systems.

Graham received the 2024 Bingham Medal from the Society of Rheology.

Graham served as the Associate Editor of the Journal of Fluid Mechanics from 2005-2012 and Editor-in-Chief of the Journal of Non-Newtonian Fluid Mechanics from 2013-2015. From 2020-2021, he was President of the Society of Rheology.

Graham is the author of two textbooks:

- Graham, Michael D. (2018). Microhydrodynamics, Brownian Motion and Complex Fluids. Cambridge University Press. ISBN 978-1-108-61440-5.
- Graham, Michael D.; Rawlings, James Blake (2013). Modeling and Analysis Principles for Chemical and Biological Engineers. Nob Hill Publishing. ISBN 978-0-975-93771-6.
