= Annual Review of Fluid Mechanics =

- Discipline: Fluid mechanics
- Language: English
- Edited by: Jonathan B. Freund; Howard Stone

Publication details
- History: 1969–present, 57 years old
- Publisher: Annual Reviews (US)
- Frequency: Annually
- Open access: Subscribe to Open
- Impact factor: 26.1 (2025)

Standard abbreviations
- ISO 4: Annu. Rev. Fluid Mech.

Indexing
- CODEN: ARVFA3
- ISSN: 0066-4189 (print); 1545-4479 (web)
- LCCN: 74080866
- OCLC no.: 1481500

Links
- Journal homepage

Annual Review of Fluid Mechanics is a peer-reviewed scientific journal covering research on fluid mechanics. It is published once a year by Annual Reviews (AR) and the editors are Parviz Moin and Howard Stone. As of 2023, Annual Review of Fluid Mechanics is being published as open access, under the Subscribe to Open model. As of 2026, Journal Citation Reports gives the journal a 2025 impact factor of 26.1, ranking it first out of 43 journals in "Physics, Fluids and Plasmas" and first out of 172 journals in the category "Mechanics".

== History ==
The Annual Review of Fluid Mechanics was first published in 1969 by Annual Reviews (AR), a nonprofit organization whose stated mission is to synthesize knowledge "for the progress of science and the benefit of society." The journal's inaugural editor was William R. Sears. Taking after the Annual Review of Biochemistry, each volume typically begins with a prefatory chapter in which a notable scientist in the field reflects on their career and accomplishments. As of 2020, it was published both in print and electronically. Some of its articles are available online in advance of the volume's publication date.

== Scope and indexing ==
Annual Review of Fluid Mechanics defines its scope as covering significant developments in the field of fluid mechanics, including its history and foundations, non-newtonian fluids, rheology, incompressible and compressible flow, plasma flow, flow stability, multiphase flow, heat mixture and transport, control of fluid flow, combustion, turbulence, shock waves, and explosions. It is abstracted and indexed in Scopus, Science Citation Index Expanded, PASCAL, Inspec, GEOBASE, and Academic Search, among others.

== Editorial processes ==
The Annual Review of Fluid Mechanics is helmed by the editor or the co-editors. The editor is assisted by the editorial committee, which includes associate editors, regular members, and occasionally guest editors. Guest members participate at the invitation of the editor, and serve terms of one year. All other members of the editorial committee are appointed by the AR board of directors and serve five-year terms. The editorial committee determines which topics should be included in each volume and solicits reviews from qualified authors. Unsolicited manuscripts are not accepted. Peer review of accepted manuscripts is undertaken by the editorial committee.

=== Editors of volumes ===
Dates indicate publication years in which someone was credited as a lead editor or co-editor of a journal volume. The planning process for a volume begins well before the volume appears, so appointment to the position of lead editor generally occurred prior to the first year shown here. An editor who has retired or died may be credited as a lead editor of a volume that they helped to plan, even if it is published after their retirement or death.

- William R. Sears (1969)
- Milton Van Dyke, Walter G. Vincenti, and John V. Wehausen (1970–1976)
- Van Dyke, Wehausen, and John L. Lumley (1977–1986)
- Van Dyke, Lumley, and Helen L. Reed (1987–2000)
- Lumley, Reed, and Stephen H. Davis (2001)
- Lumley, Davis, and Parviz Moin (2002)
- Davis and Moin (2003–2021)
- Moin and Howard A. Stone (2021-2025)
- Stone and Jonathan B. Freund (2025-)

=== Current editorial committee ===
As of 2025, the editorial committee consists of the co-editors and the following members:

- Dennice F. Gayme
- Rama Govindarajan
- Anne Juel
- Daniel Livescu
- Beverley J. McKeon
- Geoff Vallis
- Roberto Zenit

As of 2022, the editorial committee's members were:

- Jonathan B. Freund
- Dennice F. Gayme
- Anne Juel
- Daniel Livescu
- Beverley J. McKeon
- Geoff Vallis
- Roberto Zenit

== See also ==
- List of fluid mechanics journals
