= William K. George =

American fluid dynamicist

- Scientific career
- Fields: Fluid dynamics
- Thesis: An analysis of the laser-doppler velocimeter and its application to the measurement of turbulence (1971)
- Doctoral advisor: John L. Lumley

William Kenneth George (born 1945) is an American-born fluid dynamicist. He is currently senior research investigator (professor emeritus) in the Department of Aeronautics at Imperial College London.

George has been a fellow of the American Physical Society since 1988. He is also a Fellow of the American Society of Mechanical Engineers (ASME).

In October 2026, Retraction Watch reported on criticism of a cosmology paper George co-authored with Thomas Johansson in Physics of Fluids. MIT postdoctoral researcher Thomas Harvey had raised mathematical concerns on PubPeer and with the journal. George acknowledged a mathematical error but maintained that the paper's conclusions remained valid. After the journal disclosed Harvey's identity to the authors, they suggested that he withdraw his criticisms and warned that, if published, they would publicise them. They cited an earlier critic whose remarks they had presented "in every forum for several years", stating that he had "never managed to live down the stupidity and arrogance of his stupid remarks". Despite these remarks, George denied that the response was intended as a threat. AIP Publishing said it was reviewing both the concerns about the paper and their handling.

== Books ==
- 1981: (translator & editor) Wind Atlas for Denmark
- 1988: (co-editor with Roger Arndt) Advances In Turbulence, Taylor & Francis ISBN 0-89116-747-1
