= Yuwen Zhang =

Chinese-American academic

- Born: Xiaoyi, Shanxi, China
- Citizenship: United States
- Education: Xi'an Jiaotong University; University of Connecticut
- Known for: Phase change heat transfer
- Awards: AAAS Fellow (2015); ASME Fellow (2007); ONR Young Investigator Award (2002)
- Scientific career
- Fields: Mechanical Engineering
- Workplaces: University of Missouri; New Mexico State University; University of Connecticut; Wright State University; Xi'an Jiaotong University

Yuwen Zhang is an American professor of mechanical engineering who is well known for his contributions to phase change heat transfer. He is presently a Curators' Distinguished Professor and Huber and Helen Croft Chair in Engineering in the Department of Mechanical and Aerospace Engineering at the University of Missouri in Columbia, Missouri.

== Education and career ==
Yuwen Zhang earned his B.E. degree in thermal turbomachinery, M.E. and D.Eng. degrees in engineering thermophysics from Xi'an Jiaotong University, in 1985, 1988 and 1991, respectively. He taught at Xi'an Jiaotong University from 1991 to 1994 and was a research associate at Wright State University (1994-1995) and University of Connecticut (1995-1996). He received a Ph.D. degree in mechanical engineering from the University of Connecticut in 1998. He was a research scientist at University of Connecticut and a senior engineer at Thermoflow, Inc. before joining the Department of Mechanical Engineering at New Mexico State University as an assistant professor in 2001. He joined the faculty at the Department of Mechanical and Aerospace Engineering at the University of Missouri (MU) in 2003 as an associate professor and became a full professor in 2009. He was awarded a James C. Dowell Professorship in 2012 and served as the Department Chair from 2013 to 2017. He was named a Curators' Distinguished Professor in 2020 and a Huber and Helen Croft Chair in Engineering in 2021.

== Technical contributions ==
Yuwen Zhang's research area is in the field of heat and mass transfer with applications in nanomanufacturing, thermal management, and energy storage and conversion. He has published over 300 journal papers and more than 180 conference publications at national and international conferences. He has developed pioneer models for a latent heat thermal energy storage system, as well as multiscale, multiphysics models on additive manufacturing (AM), including selective laser sintering (SLS) and laser chemical vapor deposition/infiltration (LCVD/LCVI). He is the first to develop fundamental models of fluid flow and heat transfer in the oscillating heat pipes, which is a heat transfer device that can be used in thermal management of electronic devices and energy systems. He carried out theoretical studies on femtosecond laser interaction with metal and biological materials from molecular scales to system levels, and solved inverse heat transfer problems for the determination of the heating condition and/or temperature-dependent macro and micro thermophysical properties under uncertainty. He also investigated the mechanism of heat transfer enhancement in nanofluids, which are stable colloidal suspensions of solid nanomaterials with sizes typically on the order of 1-100 nm in the base fluid, via molecular dynamics (MD) simulations. Thermal management and temperature uniformity improvement of Li-ion batteries using external and internal cooling methods were also systematically studied by utilizing pin fin heat-sinks and metal/non-metal foams, as well as using electrolyte flow inside the embedded microchannels in the porous electrodes as a novel internal cooling technique.

== Professional services ==
Yuwen Zhang is the Co-Editor-in-Chief for Frontiers in Heat and Mass Transfer (FHMT), Associate Editor for ASME Journal of Heat Transfer, as well as an editorial board member for eight other journals. As a Fellow of ASME, he was the Chair (2012-2014) and the Vice-Chair (2009-2012) of the K-15 Committee on Transport Phenomena in Manufacturing and Materials Processing of the ASME Heat Transfer Division. As an Associate Fellow of AIAA, he was a Member of the AIAA Thermophysics Technical Committee (2008–2011). He is also a Fellow of the American Association for the Advancement of Science (AAAS) and a member of the American Society for Engineering Education (ASEE). In these capacities, he has served as congress, track, and session chair for numerous national and international conferences in engineering.

== Honors and awards ==
- Huber and Helen Croft Chair in Engineering, University of Missouri, 2021
- Curators' Distinguished Professor, University of Missouri, 2020
- Coulter Award, University of Missouri Coulter Translational Partnership Program, 2018
- Fellow, American Association for the Advancement of Sciences (AAAS), 2015
- James C. Dowell Professorship, University of Missouri, 2012
- Certificate of Appreciation for Service as K-15 Committee Chair, ASME Heat Transfer Division, 2014
- Certificate of Distinguished Service, American Institute of Aeronautics and Astronautics (AIAA), 2011
- Missouri Honor Senior Faculty Research Award, College of Engineering at the University of Missouri, 2010
- Chancellor's Award for Outstanding Research and Creative Activity, University of Missouri, 2010
- Fellow of American Society of Mechanical Engineers (ASME), 2007
- Associate Fellow of American Institute of Aeronautics and Astronautics (AIAA), 2008
- Faculty Fellow Award, College of Engineering at University of Missouri, 2007
- Computational Research Award, Department of Mechanical Engineering, New Mexico State University, 2003
- Young Investigator Award, Office of Naval Research (one of 26 awarded nationally in all fields), 2002

== Books ==
- Fundamentals of Multiphase Heat Transfer and Flow (with A. Faghri, 2020)
- Advanced Heat and Mass Transfer (with A. Faghri and J. Howell, 2010)
- Transport Phenomena in Multiphase Systems (with A. Faghri, 2006)

== Edited books ==
- Heat Pipes: Design, Applications and Technology (2018)
- Multiscale Thermal Transport in Energy Systems (with Y. L. He, 2016)
- Femtosecond Lasers: New Research (2013)
- Nanofluids: Research, Development and Applications (2013)
