= Stoycho Panchev =

Bulgarian meteorologist and fluid dynamicist

Stoycho Panchev Valchev
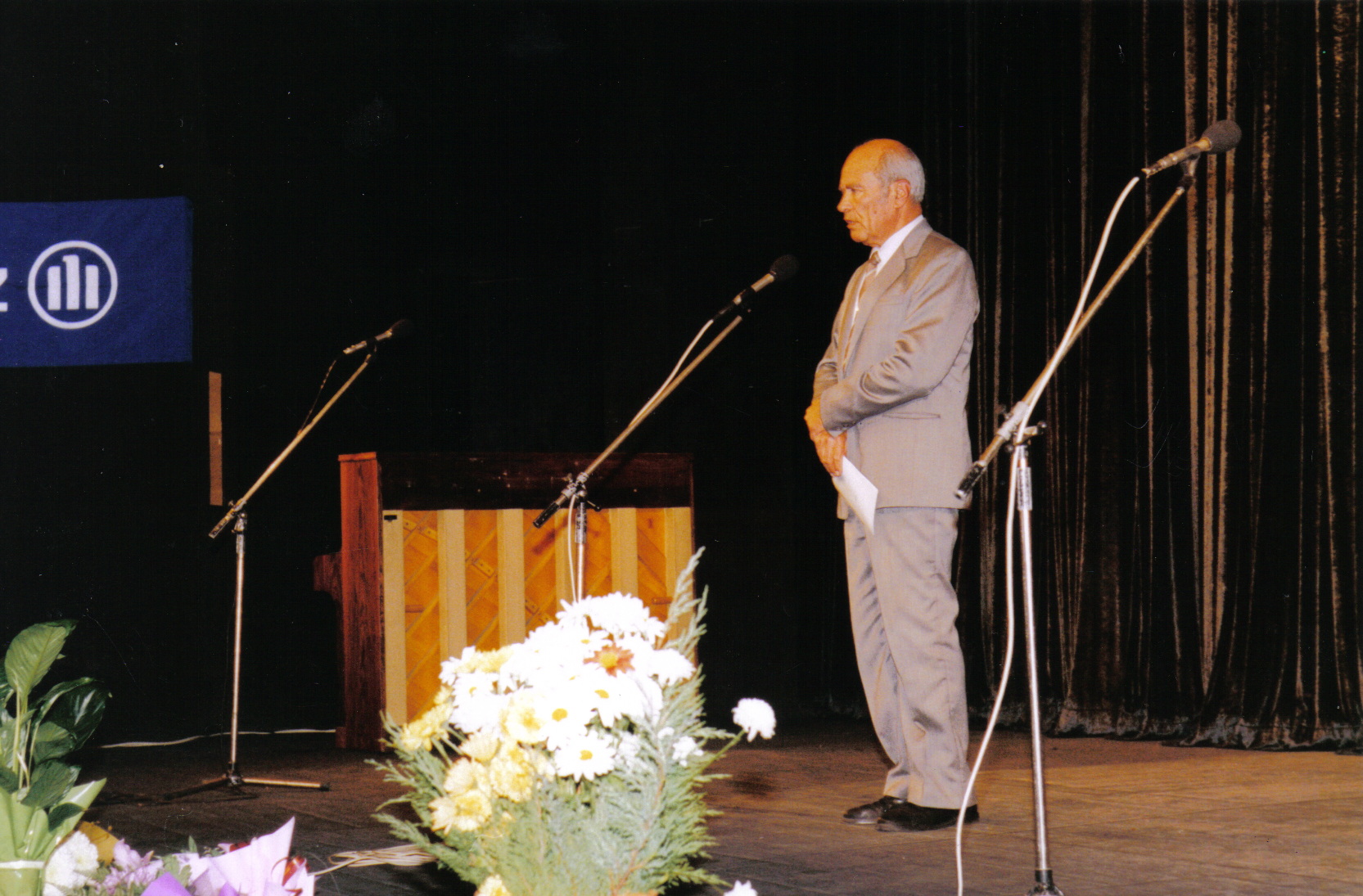
- Born: March 6, 1933
- Died: August 31, 2014 (aged 81)
- Citizenship: Bulgarian
- Education: Sofia University; Bulgarian Academy of Sciences
- Scientific career
- Fields: Meteorology; Turbulence; Chaos theory
- Workplaces: Sofia University, Colorado State University

Stoycho Panchev Valchev (Stoĭcho Panchev) (6 March 1933 – 31 August 2014) was a Bulgarian meteorologist and fluid dynamicist, and a professor of Sofia University. His book on turbulence is used as the standard text in the field of turbulence.

== Biography ==
Stoycho Panchev was born in Lisec in Lovech. He obtained his bachelor's degree from Sofia University and completed PhD at Bulgarian Academy of Sciences. He was also a visiting professor of Colorado State University.

== Books ==
- Panchev, S. (1971). Random Functions and Turbulence. Pergamon Press. ISBN 978-1483113173.
- Panchev, S. (1985). Dynamic Meteorology. Springer. ISBN 978-9400952225.
