= Albert E. Green =

British mathematician

Albert Edward Green (11 November 1912, London – 12 August 1999) was a British applied mathematician and research scientist in theoretical and applied mechanics.

== Biography ==
Green studied mathematics at Jesus College, Cambridge, where he attended lectures by Sydney Goldstein, Arthur Eddington and G. I. Taylor. In 1932 he attained a first in the first part of the Tripos examinations in mathematics and in 1934 was Wrangler in the second part. After his first very promising publications he was named the 1936 Fellow of Jesus College, received the 1936 Smith Prize, and in 1937 received his PhD under Taylor. With Taylor he published in the 1930s and 1940s a series of works on stress distribution in anisotropic plates. In 1939 Green became a lecturer at the University of Durham and then in 1948 a professor of applied mathematics at the University of Newcastle upon Tyne (at that time called King´s College of the University of Durham). In Newcastle he chaired the mathematical faculty with Werner Wolfgang Rogosinski and then alone after Rogosinki's retirement in 1959. From 1959 to 1962 Green was also Dean of the Faculty of Science. He was from 1968 Sedleian Professor of Natural Philosophy at the University of Oxford (where the elasticity theorist Augustus Edward Hough Love was one of his predecessors). In 1977 Green retired as professor emeritus and continued to publish research into his 80s.

In 1955/1956 and 1963/1964 he was a visiting professor at Brown University (working with Ronald S. Rivlin). As a frequent visiting professor at the University of California, Berkeley, he worked with Paul M. Naghdi.

Green was in his lifetime one the U.K.'s leading scientists, who in his career increasingly concerned himself with linear and after World War II nonlinear elasticity theory. In elasticity theory he worked with Wolfgang Zerna, who was in Newcastle in 1948/1949 as part of an academic exchange programme between the U.K. and Germany. (Subsequently, Zerna was a professor in Hannover.) With Rivlin, Green published some of the first works on the mechanics of materials with memory. From the mid-1960s he primarily deal with the thermodynamics of continua, the theory of elastic-plastic continua (with Naghdi) and various hydrodynamic problems (such as jets in ideal fluids). The Green-Naghdi theory of water waves, as named by R. Cengiz Ertekin, is one of the outstanding contributions of the close collaboration of Green and Paul M. Naghdi.

Green received several honorary doctorates: in 1943 from the University of Cambridge, in 1968 from the University of Oxford, in 1969 from the University of Durham, and in 1977 from the National University of Ireland. In 1958 he was made Fellow of the Royal Society. In 1974 he received the Timoshenko Medal and in 1983 the Von Karman Medal.

In 1939, he married Gwendoline May Rudston.

== Works ==
- with Wolfgang Zerna: Theoretical Elasticity, Clarendon Press, Oxford 1954, 2nd edn. 1968; Dover reprint, 1992, 2012
- with J. E. Adkins: Large elastic deformations and nonlinear continuum mechanics, Clarendon Press, Oxford 1960, 2nd edn. 1970

== Sources ==
- P. Chadwick Albert Edward Green, Biographical Memoirs Fellows Royal Society, 2001
- Paul M. Naghdi, A. J. M. Spencer, A. H. England (eds.) Nonlinear elasticity and theoretical mechanics. In Honour of A. E. Green, Oxford University Press 1994
- Mark McCartney, George Temple and Albert Green in Oxford's Sedleian Professors of Natural Philosophy ed. C.D. Hollings and M. McCartney, Oxford University Press 2023

== See also ==
- Taylor–Green vortex
