= Paul M. Naghdi =

Paul Mansour Naghdi (March 29, 1924 – July 9, 1994) was a professor of mechanical engineering at University of California, Berkeley.

== Early life and education ==
Paul Naghdi was born in Tehran on March 29, 1924. In 1943, in order to pursue his education, he undertook a perilous voyage to the United States, during which he helped navigate the ship. He studied mechanical engineering at Cornell University and graduated in January 1946. After a short period in the United States Army Corps of Engineers, he enrolled in the graduate program in the engineering mechanics department of the University of Michigan in the summer of 1946. He was granted U.S. citizenship in 1948.

Also in 1948, he received an M.S. degree. In 1951 got a PhD at the University of Michigan with the dissertation: "Large Deformation of Elasto-Plastic Circular Plates with Polar Symmetrical Loading".

== Career ==
During the period 1949 to 1951, he held the position of instructor in engineering mechanics, and upon receipt of the Ph.D., he was appointed assistant professor at Ann Arbor. He was promoted rapidly—to associate professor in 1953 and to full professor the following year. He moved to UC Berkeley in 1958 as professor of engineering science, and played an important role in the establishment of the Division of Applied Mechanics in the Department of Mechanical Engineering here. From 1964 to 1969, he served as chairman of the division. From 1991 onwards, he held the Roscoe and Elizabeth Hughes Chair in Mechanical Engineering, and in 1994 he was advanced to the newly instituted position of professor in the graduate school.

He was an active member of many committees of the American Society of Mechanical Engineers (ASME). During the period 1967-1972, he served on the executive committee of the Applied Mechanics Division of the ASME, and was chairman of the committee in 1972. For its fiftieth anniversary in 1977, Naghdi undertook the preparation of a history of the division.

From 1972 to 1984, he served on the U.S. National Committee on Theoretical and Applied Mechanics, and was chairman of the Committee in 1979-1980. During the period 1978-1984, he was a member of the General Assembly of the International Union of Theoretical and Applied Mechanics. His last appointment was to the ASME Committee on Honors (1986–1994), of which he was chairman from 1991 to 1994.

In 1987, he received an honorary DSc from the National University of Ireland

== Contribution to Continuum Mechanics ==
Naghdi's work on continuum mechanics extended over a period of more than forty years and encompassed almost all aspects of the mechanical behavior of solids and fluids. A consummate theoretician, he was most strongly attracted by fundamental questions in mechanics, and always sought to treat these at the highest level of generality. His work is marked by a penetrating physical intuition combined with a methodical and mathematical line of thought. He is best known for his research in the areas of shell theory and plasticity, but is also recognized for his contributions to linear and nonlinear elasticity, viscoelasticity, the theory of deformable rods, the theories of fluid sheets and jets, thermomechanics, mixture theory, and general continuum mechanics.

Naghdi's interest in elastic shells and plates dated back to his graduate student days at the University of Michigan, where he attended summer lectures in 1949 on elastic plates by Stephen Timoshenko. Working along classical lines, Naghdi subsequently developed a systematic treatment of elastic shells and plates undergoing small deformations, which was published in 1963.

During the 1950s, the modern renaissance in continuum mechanics was gathering momentum. It had started out in the 1940s as an interest in nonlinear elastic materials and non-Newtonian fluids, but quickly spread to envelop a much broader range of material behavior. Naghdi embraced the emerging theoretical developments and began to consider in a new light the mechanics that he had learned from classical authors such as Love, Lame, and Whittaker. As regards shell theory, he soon realized that a completely new viewpoint could be taken which would lead to an essential clarification of the subject. This is the theory of the Cosserat surface (named after the early twentieth century French elasticians Eugene and Francois Cosserat). Basically, the Cosserat surface is a mathematical model that idealizes a shell-like structure as a curved surface upon which additional independent vector fields are defined. Naghdi was able to show that inertia, momentum, and angular momentum could be ascribed to the additional fields in such a way that a set of general dynamical equations for the deformations of shells could be obtained. He was invited to write the article on shells and plates in the Handbuch der Physik. This appeared in 1972 (in Vol. VIa/2 of the Handbuch) and is universally recognized as the definitive treatment of the subject.

The Cosserat surface is not limited to modeling only solid bodies. As Naghdi came to realize in the late 1970s, sheets of water admit the same kinematical treatment as solid shells, but differ in respect to constitutive properties. Naghdi and his co-authors developed an elegant theory of fluid surfaces and applied it successfully to a wide variety of problems, including waves on a stream of variable depth, flow past obstacles and boats in lakes. In 1984, R. Cengiz Ertekin, a PhD student of John V. Wehausen and Paul Naghdi, named these equations the Green-Naghdi equations.

The second major focal area that attracted Naghdi from the beginning of his career until the end is the behavior of elastic-plastic materials. By the mid-1950s, a reasonably satisfactory theory of plasticity had been developed for materials undergoing small deformations. Naghdi and his co-workers performed a number of experimental studies and also contributed several analytical papers on infinitesimal plasticity. Naghdi's review paper of 1960 set forth a comprehensive treatment of the theory of infinitesimal plasticity and is still widely cited. In the early 1960s, Naghdi set himself the task of extending plasticity theory to encompass elastic-plastic materials at finite deformations. This was a formidable challenge, since almost every aspect of the infinitesimal theory had to be changed in order to accommodate large deformations. His 1965 plasticity paper with his friend and long-term collaborator A.E. Green is the first systematic treatment of elastic-plastic materials undergoing large deformations. Over the next two decades, Naghdi continued to work on important aspects of plasticity, and in 1990, thirty years after the publication of his review article on infinitesimal plasticity, he offered an even finer critical account of the modern theory.

== Death ==
After his long career for over three decades as a professor in the Department of Mechanical Engineering, he succumbed to lung cancer at his home in Berkeley, California. He died on July 9, 1994.

== Achievements ==
In recognition of his achievements, Naghdi received many prestigious awards. In 1956, he received the University of Michigan Distinguished Faculty Award. This was followed in 1958 by a John Simon Guggenheim Memorial Foundation Fellowship. In 1962, he received the George Westinghouse Award of the American Society of Engineering Education. On two occasions (1963 and 1971), he was appointed a Research Professor in Berkeley's Miller Institute for Basic Research in Science, and from 1991 he held the Roscoe and Elizabeth Hughes Chair in Mechanical Engineering. For his fundamental contributions to plasticity and to shell theory, he was awarded the Timoshenko Medal by the ASME in 1980, which justly placed his name on the list of the top engineering scientists of this century. He was made an honorary member of the ASME in 1983, and a member of the National Academy of Engineering in 1984. In 1986, he was awarded the Eringen Medal of the Society of Engineering Science in 1986. He held honorary doctor's degrees from the National University of Ireland (1987) and Universite Catholique de Louvain (1992). In 1994, he was honored with the Berkeley Citation. Additionally, he was selected by the Academic Senate as one of Berkeley's two Faculty Research Lecturers for 1994-95.

== Awards and distinctions ==
- George Westinghouse Award of the American Society for Engineering Education (1962)
- A. Cemal Eringen Medal (1986)
- Honorary doctorate, National University of Ireland (1987)
- Honorary doctorate, Université catholique de Louvain (1992)
- Berkeley Citation (1994)
- Timoshenko Medal of the American Society of Mechanical Engineers in 1980
- Member of the National Academy of Engineering in 1984

== See also ==
- Plasticity
