= Helen Reid =

Helen Reid may refer to:

- Helen Rogers Reid, American newspaper publisher
- Helen Richmond Young Reid, Canadian social reformer

== See also ==
- Helen Reed (disambiguation)
