= An Album of Fluid Motion =

- 1982 original cover of An Album of Fluid Motion
- Editor: Milton Van Dyke
- Language: English
- Publisher: The Parabolic Press
- Publication place: United States
- Media type: Print (hardcover, paper back)
- Pages: 175
- ISBN: 0-915760-02-9 (hardcover)

The book An Album of Fluid Motion is a collection of black-and-white photographs of flow visualizations for different types of fluid flows. These flows include:

- Creeping flow
- Laminar flow
- Flow separation
- Vortices
- Fluid instability
- Fluid turbulence
- Free-surface flow
- Natural convection
- Subsonic flow
- Shock waves
- Supersonic flow

The book was self-published by its editor, Milton Van Dyke, fluid mechanics professor at Stanford University.

== Reviews ==
- Self-published, designed handsomely within the family, this collection needs and will enduringly reward many owners. What technical library can be without it? – Philip Morrison, Scientific American
- All teachers of fluid mechanics should have a copy of this 'album' and should use it first to enlarge their own understanding and then that of their students. – G. K. Batchelor, Journal of Fluid Mechanics
- This compilation, aptly entitled an "album" ... is a remarkable and magnificent achievement. – Charles Thurlow III, Chemical Engineering
- The educator finds beautiful and important illustrations for his lectures in fluid mechanics, and the student should also want to own the book. – N. Rott, Zeitschrift für Angewandte Mathematik und Physik
- Everybody with an interest in fluid dynamics, from freshman to expert, will enjoy and benefit from this book; everybody can afford to buy it; everybody should. – Peter Bradshaw, Contemporary Physics
- An Album of Fluid Motion is a lovely book and a rare bargain. It should be part of any physics library and many personal collections. – Jerry P. Golub, American Journal of Physics
- Neophyte or expert, student or practitioner, everyone will be enchanted by this book. I have seen a delighted reaction to it in those unfamiliar with the study of fluid motion, and I have also been approached by scientists with fingers pointed at pictures in the Album to prove a technical point. – Raul Conti, Journal of the Astronautical Sciences
- I cannot imagine a fluid dynamicist without this wonderful book. It should be required reading for all graduate students in the fluid thermal engineering field. – R. A. Granger, Ocean Engineering
