= Milton Van Dyke =

- Born: August 1, 1922; Chicago, U.S.
- Died: May 10, 2010 (aged 87)
- Education: Harvard University; California Institute of Technology
- Known for: Fluid dynamics Van Dyke flows
- Awards: • Fulbright Award for Research (1954) • Guggenheim Fellowship (1954) • Otto Laporte Award (APS, 1986) • Fluid Dynamics Award (AIAA, 1997)
- Scientific career
- Fields: Fluid dynamics
- Workplaces: Stanford University
- Thesis: A Study Of Second-Order Supersonic Flow (1949)
- Doctoral advisor: Paco Lagerstrom
- Doctoral students: Ali H. Nayfeh; Ramesh K. Agarwal

Milton Denman Van Dyke (August 1, 1922 – May 10, 2010) was Professor of the Department of Aeronautics and Astronautics at Stanford University. He was known for his work in fluid dynamics, especially with respect to the use of perturbation analysis in aerodynamics. His often-cited book An Album of Fluid Motion presents a collection of about 400 selected black-and-white photographs of flow visualization in experiments, received – on his request – from researchers all over the world.

Together with Bill Sears, Milton founded the Annual Review of Fluid Mechanics, in 1969, for which he was an editor until 2000.

== Biography ==
He was the son of James and Ruth (Barr) Van Dyke.

He studied Engineering Sciences at Harvard University, from 1940 until 1943. Thereafter he started working at NACA Ames Laboratory. After the Second World War, Milton went to Caltech, to obtain his MS in 1947 and PhD (magna cum laude) in 1949. A second period at Ames Laboratory followed. During this period, Milton was awarded a Guggenheim fellowship and Fulbright grant, which he used to spend the 1954–55 academic year working with George Batchelor at Cambridge University. He was a visiting professor at the University of Paris in the 1958–59 academic year, then in 1959 he was appointed as a professor at the new Aerodynamics department of Stanford University.

He married Sylvia Jean Agard Adams in 1962 and the couple would eventually have six children, three of whom were triplets. In 1976, he was elected to the National Academy of Engineering.

He was the director of Parabolic Press, an independent publisher of engineering books whose releases included a second edition of his own Perturbation Methods in Fluid Mechanics (1975) and An album of fluid motion (1982). He insisted on keeping the prices low so that students could afford the books.

The first issue in 2014 of the Journal of Engineering Mathematics was a special issue to honour Milton Van Dyke and his work.

== Books ==
- Van Dyke, Milton (1964). Perturbation Methods in Fluid Mechanics (1st ed.). Stanford: Academic Press. ISBN 9780127130507.
- Van Dyke, Milton (1975). Perturbation methods in fluid mechanics (2nd, annotated ed.). The Parabolic Press. ISBN 9780915760015.
- Van Dyke, Milton (1982). An album of fluid motion. The Parabolic Press. ISBN 9780915760022.
