= Roberto Zenit =

Mexican scientist

Academic background
- Education: National Autonomous University of Mexico; California Institute of Technology

Roberto Zenit is a Mexican scientist currently at the Brown University School of Engineering. Zenit previously worked at the National Autonomous University of Mexico and is an Elected Fellow of the American Physical Society. His field of expertise is Fluid Mechanics, including Two-Phase Flows, Non-Newtonian Fluids, the Fluid Mechanics of Painting, and Biological Flows. Recent work has also focused on studying the behaviour of Bubbly Drinks.
