= Hydroelasticity =

In fluid dynamics and elasticity, hydroelasticity or flexible fluid-structure interaction (FSI), is a branch of science which is concerned with the motion of deformable bodies through liquids. The theory of hydroelasticity has been adapted from aeroelasticity, to describe the effect of structural response of the body on the fluid around it.

== Definition ==
It is the analysis of the time-dependent interaction of hydrodynamic and elastic structural forces. Vibration of floating and submerged ocean structures/vessels encompasses this field of naval architecture.

== Importance ==
Hydroelasticity is of concern in various areas of marine technology such as:

- High-speed craft.
- Ships with the phenomena springing and whipping affecting fatigue and extreme loading
- Large scale floating structures such as floating airports, floating bridges and buoyant tunnels.
- Marine Risers.
- Cable systems and umbilicals for remotely operated or tethered underwater vehicles.
- Seismic cable systems.
- Flexible containers for water transport, oil spill recovery and other purposes.

== Areas of research ==
- Analytical and numerical methods in FSI.
- Techniques for laboratory and in-service investigations.
- Stochastic methods.
- Hydroelasticity-based prediction of Wave Loads and Responses.
- Impact, sloshing and shock.
- Flow induced vibration (FIV).
- Tsunami and seaquake induced responses of large marine structures.
- Devices for energy extraction.

== Current research ==
Analysis and design of marine structures or systems necessitates integration of hydrodynamics and structural mechanics; i.e. hydroelasticity plays the key role. There has been significant recent progress in research into the hydroelastic phenomena, and the topic of hydroelasticity is of considerable current interest.

== Institutes and laboratories ==
- Norwegian University of Science and Technology (NTNU), Trondheim, Norway
- University of Southampton, Southampton, UK.
- MARINTEK : Marine Technology Centre, Trondheim, Norway
- MARIN : Maritime Research Institute Netherlands.
- MIT
- University of Michigan.
- Indian Institute of Technology Kharagpur, India.
- Saint Petersburg State University, Russia.
- National Maritime Research Institute, Japan.
- Research Institute of Applied Mechanics, Kyushu University, Japan.
- Computational Fluid Dynamics Laboratory, National Taiwan University of Science and Technology, Taiwan.
- Lee Dynamics, Houston, Texas, USA

== Conferences ==
- HYDROELAS : International conference on Hydroelasticity in marine technology.
- FSI : International conference on fluid-structure interaction.
- OT : Offshore Technology Conference.
- ISOPE : International Society of Offshore and Polar Engineers conference.

== Journals ==
- Journal of Sound and Vibration.
- Journal of Ship Research.
- Applied Ocean research.
- Journal of Engineering Mechanics.
- IEEE Journal of Oceanic Engineering.
- Journal of Fluids and Structures
