= Snezhana Abarzhi =

Applied mathematician and mathematical physicist

Snezhana I. Abarzhi
- Education: Moscow Institute of Physics and Technology; Russian Academy of Sciences
- Known for: Research in fluid instabilities, interfaces, mixing and far from equilibrium dynamics
- Scientific career
- Fields: Applied mathematics; Mathematical physics
- Workplaces: Russian Academy of Sciences; UNC Chapel Hill; University of Bayreuth; Stony Brook University; Osaka University; Stanford University; University of Chicago; Illinois Inst. Tech.; Carnegie Mellon University; University of Western Australia (2016—2021)

Snezhana I. Abarzhi is an applied mathematician and theoretical physicist specializing in the dynamics of fluids and plasmas and their applications in nature and technology. Her research has revealed that instabilities elucidate dynamics of supernova blasts, and that supernovae explode more slowly and less turbulently than previously thought, changing the understanding of the mechanisms by which heavy atomic nuclei are formed in these explosions. Her works have found the mechanism of interface stabilization, the special self-similar class in interfacial mixing, and the fundamentals of Rayleigh-Taylor instabilities.

== Education and career ==
Snezhana I. Abarzhi was born and raised in Vasilkov, a suburb of Kiev, in 1967, in the former Soviet Union, to a Bulgarian-Ukrainian family, the daughter of Ivan I. Abarzhi (a doctor of science and professor) and Maria I. Abarzhi (a school teacher and vice-principal). In 1984 after graduating high school with the gold medal of excellence, she pursued her higher education at the Moscow Institute of Physics and Technology (MIPT). At the MIPT Abarzhi earned bachelor's degrees in physics and applied mathematics and in molecular biology in 1987, accomplished the Landau's course in theoretical physics in 1988, and then earned a master's degree in physics and applied mathematics, summa cum laude, in 1990. She completed her doctorate in 1994 through the Landau Institute for Theoretical Physics and Kapitza Institute for Physical Problems of the Russian Academy of Sciences, supervised by Sergei I. Anisimov.

Snezhana Abarzhi was an active researcher at the Russian Academy of Sciences in 1994 - 1997. She started working in the US in 1997 as a visiting professor at the University of North Carolina in Chapel Hill, and then in 1998 became an Alexander von Humboldt Fellow at the University of Bayreuth in Germany. In 1999 she took a research position at Stony Brook University. In 2002 she was selected as a recipient of the Japan Society for the Promotion of Science research professorship at Osaka University, and then became a senior fellow in the Center for Turbulence Research at Stanford University in the US. In 2005 she was appointed as a research faculty member at the University of Chicago, adding to it in 2006 an associate professorship at the Illinois Institute of Technology. In 2013 she joined Carnegie Mellon University as a professor of physics and mathematics. In 2016 she was appointed professor and chair of applied mathematics at the University of Western Australia, a position she held until circa 2021.

Abarzhi's research has led her to join the Committee on Scientific Publications of the American Physical Society; (2022–2025). Snezhana Abarzhi is an organizer of conferences and programs on far from equilibrium dynamics of interfaces and turbulent mixing and beyond.

== Recognition ==
In 2020 Abarzhi was named a Fellow of the American Physical Society (APS) following a nomination from the APS Division of Fluid Dynamics, "for deep and abiding work on the Rayleigh-Taylor and related instabilities, and for sustained leadership in that community".

== Selected publications ==
- Abarzhi, Snezhana I.; Bhowmick, Aklant K.; Naveh, Annie; Pandian, Arun; Swisher, Nora C.; Stellingwerf, Robert F.; Arnett, W. David (10 September 2019). "Supernova, nuclear synthesis, fluid instabilities, and interfacial mixing". Proceedings of the National Academy of Sciences. 116 (37): 18184–18192. Bibcode:2019PNAS..11618184A. doi:10.1073/pnas.1714502115. PMC 6744890. PMID 30478062.
- Abarzhi, Snezhana I.; Ilyin, Daniil V.; Goddard, William A.; Anisimov, Sergei I. (10 September 2019). "Interface dynamics: Mechanisms of stabilization and destabilization and structure of flow fields". Proceedings of the National Academy of Sciences. 116 (37): 18218–18226. Bibcode:2019PNAS..11618218A. doi:10.1073/pnas.1714500115. PMC 6744915. PMID 30082395.
- Abarzhi, Snezhana I. (13 April 2010). "Review of theoretical modelling approaches of Rayleigh–Taylor instabilities and turbulent mixing". Philosophical Transactions of the Royal Society A: Mathematical, Physical and Engineering Sciences. 368 (1916): 1809–1828. Bibcode:2010RSPTA.368.1809A. doi:10.1098/rsta.2010.0020. PMID 20211884.
- Abarzhi, S. I. (13 July 1998). "Stable Steady Flows in Rayleigh-Taylor Instability". Physical Review Letters. 81 (2): 337–340. Bibcode:1998PhRvL..81..337A. doi:10.1103/physrevlett.81.337.
- Abarzhi, Snezhana I.; Hill, Desmond L.; Williams, Kurt C.; Li, Jiahe T.; Remington, Bruce A.; Martinez, David; Arnett, W. David (1 March 2023). "Fluid dynamic mathematical aspects of supernova remnants". Physics of Fluids. 35 (3) 034106. Bibcode:2023PhFl...35c4106A. doi:10.1063/5.0123930. OSTI 2229992.
- Abarzhi, Snezhana I.; Sreenivasan, Katepalli R. (22 November 2022). "Self-similar Rayleigh–Taylor mixing with accelerations varying in time and space". Proceedings of the National Academy of Sciences. 119 (47) e2118589119. Bibcode:2022PNAS..11918589A. doi:10.1073/pnas.2118589119. PMC 9704740. PMID 36375067.
- Ilyin, Dan V.; Abarzhi, Snezhana I. (July 2022). "Interface dynamics and flow fields' structure under thermal heat flux, thermal conductivity, destabilizing acceleration and inertial stabilization". SN Applied Sciences. 4 (7) 197. doi:10.1007/s42452-022-05000-4.
- Meshkov, Evgeny E; Abarzhi, Snezhana I (December 2019). "Group theory and jelly's experiment of Rayleigh–Taylor instability and Rayleigh–Taylor interfacial mixing". Fluid Dynamics Research. 51 (6): 065502. arXiv:1901.04578. Bibcode:2019FlDyR..51f5502M. doi:10.1088/1873-7005/ab3e83.
- Abarzhi, Snezhana I. (15 April 2024). "Perspective: group theory analysis and special self-similarity classes in Rayleigh–Taylor and Richtmyer–Meshkov interfacial mixing with variable accelerations". Reviews of Modern Plasma Physics. 8 (1) 15. Bibcode:2024RvMPP...8...15A. doi:10.1007/s41614-023-00142-3.
- Abarzhi, Snezhana I.; Azechi, Hiroshi; Williams, Kurt C. (September 2025). "Physics of matter and Rayleigh–Taylor hydro mixing in high-energy-density plasmas". Physics of Fluids. 37 (9) 092114. Bibcode:2025PhFl...37i2114A. doi:10.1063/5.0283113.
