= Anne Juel =

Fluid dynamics researcher

- Occupations: Professor of Fluid Dynamics in the School of Physics & Astronomy

Academic background
- Education: Pierre and Marie Curie University; École normale supérieure University of Oxford

Academic work
- Discipline: Physicist
- Sub-discipline: Fluid mechanics specialist
- Institutions: University of Manchester

Anne Juel is a physicist and academic who is currently Professor of Fluid Dynamics in the School of Physics & Astronomy at the University of Manchester. Juel is known for her research on fluid mechanics, the dynamics of surfaces in fluids, instability in fluid dynamics, viscous fingering, and convection. She has also studied the way ribbons curl when a scissor blade is run along them. At the University of Manchester, she directs the Manchester Centre for Nonlinear Dynamics. Her current research in her group is focused on two-phase microfluidics, fluid-structure interaction, wetting and flows of complex fluids. Extensively, she is familiar with the topic of U-shaped disks in Stokes flow as well as periodic dynamics in viscous fingering. Juel has also worked on research involving red blood cell dynamics in extravascular biological tissues modelled as canonical disordered porous media.

== Education and career ==
Juel earned a Diplôme d'études universitaires générales in mathematics and physics at Pierre and Marie Curie University in 1991, a master's degree in physics jointly between Pierre and Marie Curie University and the École normale supérieure (Paris) in 1994, and a Diplôme d'études approfondies in the physics of liquids at Pierre and Marie Curie University in 1994. She earned a doctorate (D.Phil.) at the University of Oxford in 1998.

After postdoctoral research at the University of Texas at Austin and the University of Manchester, she joined the University of Manchester School of Mathematics in 2001, and moved to the School of Physics & Astronomy in 2014.

== Recognition ==
In 2019, Juel was named a Fellow of the American Physical Society (APS), after a nomination from the APS Division of Fluid Dynamics, "for fundamental contributions to the understanding of instabilities and dynamics of free surfaces, interfaces, and bubbles, gained by combining precision laboratory experiments with mathematical modeling".
