= John L. Lumley =

John Leask Lumley
- Born: November 4, 1930; Detroit, Michigan
- Died: May 30, 2015 (aged 84); Ithaca, New York
- Education: Johns Hopkins University
- Known for: Fluid turbulence
- Awards: Fluid Dynamics Prize (1990)
- Scientific career
- Fields: Fluid dynamics
- Workplaces: Pennsylvania State University; Cornell University
- Doctoral advisor: Stanley Corrsin
- Doctoral students: William K. George

John Leask Lumley (4 November 1930 – 30 May 2015) was an American fluid dynamicist and a professor at Cornell University. He is widely known for his research in turbulence and is the coauthor of A First Course in Turbulence along with Hendrik Tennekes.

== Academic career ==
Lumley received his M.S.E. and Ph.D. degrees from Johns Hopkins University in 1954 and 1957 respectively. His Ph.D. thesis supervisor was Stanley Corrsin. He started his academic career at the Pennsylvania State University where he became Evan Pugh Professor of Aerospace Engineering. He was also in charge of research on turbulence and transition at the Applied Research Laboratory. In 1977 Lumley joined Cornell University where he was the Willis H. Carrier Professor of Mechanical and Aerospace Engineering (Emeritus) until his death in May 2015 of brain cancer. He was an editor of the Annual Review of Fluid Mechanics from 1977 to 2002.

== Honors and awards ==
Lumley received the 1990 Fluid Dynamics Prize of American Physical Society, "For his outstanding contributions to the understanding of turbulent flow, in particular, the fundamental structure of turbulent shear flows, the effects of drag-reducing additives, and his widely recognized contributions to the statistical theory of turbulence, and for his personal and intellectual leadership in the international fluid dynamics community, including his educational films and books, and his long active devotion to the Division of Fluid Dynamics of The American Physical Society." He has also received several other awards, including:

- Fluid and Plasma Dynamics Award of the American Institute of Aeronautics and Astronautics, 1982
- Timoshenko Medal, 1993
- Recipient of two honorary doctorate degrees (honoris causa) from the French University System, in Lyon and in Poitiers.
- Fellow of the American Institute of Aeronautics and Astronautics
- Fellow of the American Academy of Arts and Sciences
- Member of the National Academy of Engineering

== Books authored ==
- Tennekes, H. and J. L. Lumley, A First Course in Turbulence, MIT Press, Cambridge, MA (1972). ISBN 978-0262200196
- Holmes, P., J. L. Lumley, and G. Berkooz, Turbulence, Coherent Structures, Dynamical Systems and Symmetry, Cambridge University Press (1998). ISBN 978-0-521-63419-9
- Lumley, J. L., Engines: An Introduction, Cambridge University Press, (1999). hbk ISBN 0-521-64277-9; pbk ISBN 0-521-64489-5
- Lumley, J. L., Still Life with Cars: An Automotive Memoir, McFarland, (2005). ISBN 0-7864-2053-7
- Lumley, J. L., Stochastic Tools in Turbulence, Dover Publications (2007). ISBN 978-0-486-46270-7
- Monin, A. S., A. M. Yaglom, and J. L. Lumley, Statistical Fluid Mechanics - vol 1: Mechanics of Turbulence, The MIT Press (1971). ISBN 978-0-262-13062-2
- Lumley, J. L., H. A. Panofsky, "The Structure of Atmospheric Turbulence", John Wiley & Sons, Inc, New York, NY (1964). ISBN 978-0470553657
