= Hendrik Tennekes =

Dutch scientist (1936–2021)

Hendrik Tennekes (13 December 1936 – 3 July 2021) was a Dutch director of research at the Royal Dutch Meteorological Institute (Koninklijk Nederlands Meteorologisch Instituut, or KNMI), and was a Professor of Aeronautical Engineering at Pennsylvania State University and Professor of Meteorology at the Vrije Universiteit Amsterdam (Free University (VU) in Amsterdam). He is known for his work in the fields of turbulence and multi-modal forecasting. He authored the textbooks The Simple Science of Flight: From Insects to Jumbo Jets and A First Course in Turbulence with John L. Lumley. The book "A First Course in Turbulence", is a classic that logs more than 12,000 citations on Google Scholar.

Tennekes has stressed the limited predictability of complex systems and the limited value of predictions based on scientific modeling.

He was a member of the Royal Netherlands Academy of Arts and Sciences (Koninklijke Nederlandse Akademie van Wetenschappen, KNAW) from 1982 – 2010. Tennekes died on 3 July 2021, at the age of 84.

== Controversy ==
In an interview in the Dutch paper De Telegraaf, Tennekes says he was ousted from his position at the Royal Dutch Meteorological Institute due to his skepticism over climate change. After publishing a column critical of climate model accuracy, Tennekes says he was told "within two years, you'll be out on the street".

According to a search of 22,000 academic journals, Henk Tennekes had not published any original research in a peer-reviewed journal since 1990. Prior to 1990, Tennekes has published research mainly in the area of meteorology, and never about climate change.

== Books ==
- The Simple Science of Flight, MIT Press, 1997. ISBN 0-262-70065-4
- The Simple Science of Flight. From Insects to Jumbo Jets. Revised and Expanded Edition, 2009. MIT Press. Paperback ISBN 978-0-262-51313-5
- A First Course in Turbulence, with John L. Lumley, MIT Press, 1972. ISBN 0-262-20019-8
