= Supersonic flow over a flat plate =

Supersonic flow over a flat plate is a classical fluid dynamics problem. There is no exact solution to it.

== Physics ==
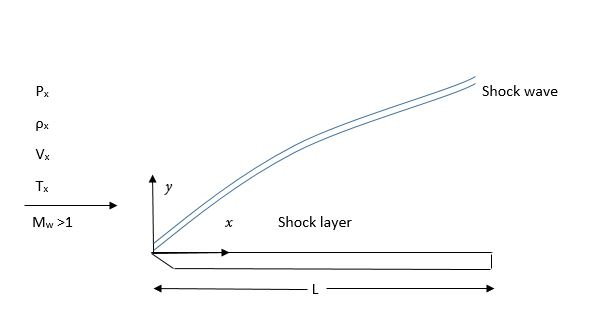
Supersonic flow over a sharp leading edged flat plate at zero incidence

When a fluid flow at the speed of sound over a thin sharp flat plate over the leading edge at low incident angle at low Reynolds Number. Then a laminar boundary layer will be developed at the leading edge of the plate. And as there are viscous boundary layer, the plate will have a fictitious boundary layer so that a curved induced shock wave will be generated at the leading edge of the plate. The shock layer is the region between the plate surface and the boundary layer. This shock layer be further subdivided into layer of viscid and inviscid flow, according to the values of Mach number, Reynolds Number and Surface Temperature. However, if the entire layer is viscous, it is called as merged shock layer.

== Solution to the Problem ==
This Fluid dynamics problem can be solved by different Numerical Methods. However, to solve it with Numerical Methods several assumptions have to be considered. And as a result shock layer properties and shock location is determined. Results vary with one or more than one of viscosity of the fluid, Mach number and angle of incidence changes. Generally for large angles of incidences, the variation of Reynold's Number has significant effects on the change of the flow variables, whereas the viscous effects are dominant on the upper surface of the plate as well as behind the trailing edge of the plate.

Different experimenters get different result as per the assumptions they have made to solve the problem.

The primary method which is generally used to this problem:

=== Explicit Finite Difference Approach ===
This method involves using time-dependent Navier-Stokes equation which is advantageous because of its inherent ability to evolve to the correct steady state solution. The continuity, momentum and energy equations and some other situational equations are needed to solve the problem. MacCormack's time marching technique is applied and then using Taylor series expansion the flow field variables are advanced at each grid point. Then, initial boundary conditions are applied and solving equations will converge to approximated results. These equations can be solved by using different algorithms to get better and efficient results with minimum errors.
