= Shelley Anna =

American chemical engineer

Shelley Lynn Anna is an American chemical engineer and experimental fluid dynamics researcher who studies droplets, multiphase flow, and the effects of surfactants in microfluidics, the rheology of extensional and interfacial flows, and microscale transport. She is a professor of chemical engineering and associate dean for faculty and graduate affairs and strategic initiatives in the Carnegie Mellon University College of Engineering.

== Education and career ==
Anna majored in physics at Carnegie Mellon University, graduating in 1995. She went to Harvard University for graduate study in engineering sciences, where she earned her master's degree in 1996, and completed her Ph.D. in 2000.

From 2000 to 2001 she worked for Solutia, in Springfield, Massachusetts as a senior research engineer before going to Harvard University for postdoctoral research. She returned to Carnegie Mellon University in 2003 as an assistant professor of mechanical engineering. She moved to the department of chemical engineering in 2008, before being promoted to associate professor in 2009 and full professor in 2013. She also holds courtesy appointments in the Department of Physics and the Department of Mechanical Engineering.

Anna is also a cello player and has used cello demonstrations as an example in her work as an engineering educator.

== Recognition ==
Anna was named a Fellow of the American Physical Society (APS) in 2014, after a nomination from the APS Division of Fluid Dynamics, "for contributions in extensional rheology and droplet microfluidics and in particular for elucidating and manipulating the effect of surfactants in microfluidic tip streaming".
