= Anke Lindner =

German physicist

Anke Lindner is a German physicist known for her work on Non-Newtonian fluids and viscous fingering, especially in complex suspensions. She is a professor at Paris Cité University, formerly called Paris Diderot University.

== Education and career ==
Lindner began her studies at the University of Bayreuth. She came to Pierre and Marie Curie University through the Erasmus Programme, and discovering her interest in complex fluids there, completed a doctorate through the École normale supérieure (Paris). After a year working as a consultant in Zürich, she took a postdoctoral research position at ESPCI Paris, following which she became a lecturer at Pierre and Marie Curie University and a researcher for ESPCI. She took her present position at Paris Diderot University in 2013.

== Recognition ==
In 2019, Lindner was named a Fellow of the American Physical Society (APS), after a nomination from the APS Division of Fluid Dynamics, "for outstanding contributions to the physics of complex fluids, interfacial flow instabilities, purely elastic instabilities, flexible fibers in Newtonian and complex fluids, active matter, and the pioneering use of microfluidic experiments in these fields".

She was the 2019 winner of the Maurice Couette prize of the Groupe Français de Rhéologie. In 2021 she won the CNRS Silver Medal.
