= Zeitschrift für Angewandte Mathematik und Physik =

- Discipline: Fluid mechanics, solid mechanics, differential equations/applied mathematics
- Language: English
- Edited by: Kaspar Nipp

Publication details
- History: 1950–present
- Publisher: Birkhäuser Verlag
- Frequency: Bimonthly
- Impact factor: 1.711 (2017)

Standard abbreviations
- ISO 4: Z. Angew. Math. Phys.

Indexing
- CODEN: ZAMPDB
- ISSN: 0044-2275 (print); 1420-9039 (web)
- LCCN: 52017098
- OCLC no.: 868969274

Links
- Journal homepage; Online access

The Zeitschrift für Angewandte Mathematik und Physik (English: Journal of Applied Mathematics and Physics) is a bimonthly peer-reviewed scientific journal published by Birkhäuser Verlag. The editor-in-chief is Kaspar Nipp (ETH Zurich). It was established in 1950 and covers the fields of theoretical and applied mechanics, applied mathematics, and related topics. According to the Journal Citation Reports, the journal has a 2017 impact factor of 1.711.
