= Ricardo Vinuesa =

- Born: 4 February 1986 (age 40); Spain
- Education: Polytechnic University of Valencia, Illinois Institute of Technology
- Occupation: KTH Royal Institute of Technology
- Known for: turbulence, computational fluid dynamics, machine learning
- Notable work: Research in Google Scholar: http://scholar.google.es/citations?user=xxF-4YgAAAAJ&hl=en Research group VinuesaLab: https://www.vinuesalab.com/
- Awards: Göran Gustafsson Award to Young Researchers, Outstanding Young Alumnus Award (IIT)

Ricardo Vinuesa Motilva (born 4 February 1986 in Valencia, Spain) is a fluid dynamicist and machine-learning researcher. He is an associate professor at KTH Royal Institute of Technology in Stockholm (Sweden), as well as an Affiliated Researcher at the AI Sustainability Center. He is also vice director of the KTH Digitalization Platform. He is known for his work on turbulence (including computational fluid dynamics and machine-learning methods) and sustainability. Vinuesa led an influential study on the impact of AI on the 17 Sustainable Development Goals (SDGs) of the United Nations (UN).

== Most-cited Publications ==
- Vinuesa R, Azizpour H, Leite I, Balaam M, Dignum V, Domisch S, Felländer A, Langhans SD, Tegmark M, Fuso Nerini F. The role of artificial intelligence in achieving the Sustainable Development Goals. Nature communications. 2020 Jan 13;11(1):1-0. (Cited 487 times, according to Google Scholar)
- Srinivasan PA, Guastoni L, Azizpour H, Schlatter PH, Vinuesa R. Predictions of turbulent shear flows using deep neural networks. Physical Review Fluids. 2019 May 10;4(5):054603. (Cited 118 times, according to Google Scholar.)
- R Vinuesa, A Noorani, A Lozano-Durán, GKE Khoury, P Schlatter, ...[et al.] Aspect ratio effects in turbulent duct flows studied through direct numerical simulation Journal of Turbulence 15 (10), 677-706 (Cited 115 times, according to Google Scholar.)
- SM Hosseini, R Vinuesa, P Schlatter, A Hanifi, DS Henningson. Direct numerical simulation of the flow around a wing section at moderate Reynolds number International Journal of Heat and Fluid Flow 61, 117-128 (Cited108 times, according to Google Scholar.)
- Vinuesa R, Negi PS, Atzori M, Hanifi A, Henningson DS, Schlatter P. Turbulent boundary layers around wing sections up to Rec= 1,000,000. International Journal of Heat and Fluid Flow. 2018 Aug 1;72:86-99. (Cited 99 times, according to Google Scholar.)
