= Boundary conditions in computational fluid dynamics =

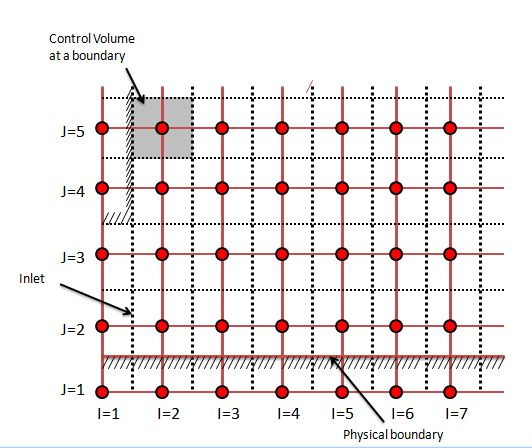
Fig 1 Formation of grid in cfd

Almost every computational fluid dynamics problem is defined under the limits of initial and boundary conditions. When constructing a staggered grid, it is common to implement boundary conditions by adding an extra node across the physical boundary. The nodes just outside the inlet of the system are used to assign the inlet conditions and the physical boundaries can coincide with the scalar control volume boundaries. This makes it possible to introduce the boundary conditions and achieve discrete equations for nodes near the boundaries with small modifications.

The choice of the correct type of boundary conditions is critical for obtaining physical solutions. The most common boundary conditions used in computational fluid dynamics are

- Intake conditions
- Symmetry conditions
- Physical boundary conditions
- Cyclic conditions
- Pressure conditions
- Exit conditions

== Intake boundary conditions ==
Consider the case of an inlet perpendicular to the x direction.

- For the first u, v, φ-cell all links to neighboring nodes are active, so there is no need of any modifications to discretion equations.
- At one of the inlet node absolute pressure is fixed and made pressure correction to zero at that node.
- Generally computational fluid dynamics codes estimate k and ε with approximate formulate based on turbulent intensity between 1 and 6% and length scale

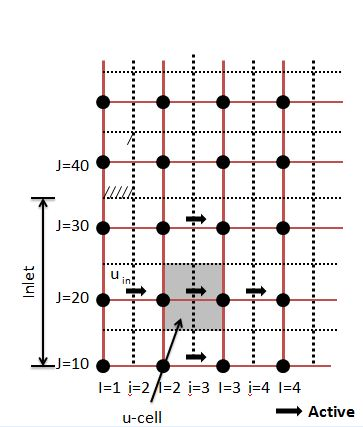
Fig.2 u-velocity cell at intake boundary

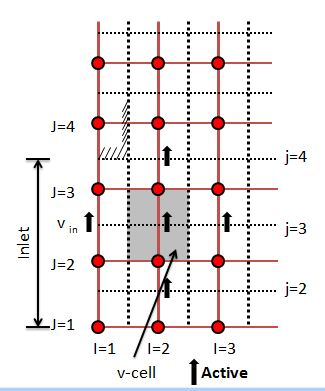
Fig.3 v-velocity cell at intake boundary

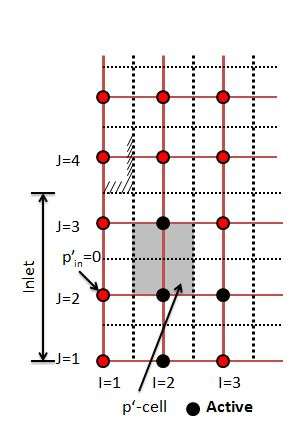
Fig.4 pressure correction cell at intake boundary

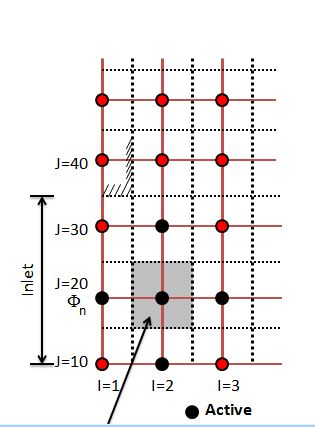
Fig. 5 scalar cell at intake boundary

== Symmetry boundary condition ==
If flow across the boundary is zero:

Normal velocities are set to zero

Scalar flux across the boundary is zero:

In this type of situations values of properties just adjacent to the solution domain are taken as values at the nearest node just inside the domain.

== Physical boundary conditions ==
Consider situation solid wall parallel to the x-direction:

Assumptions made and relations considered-

- The near wall flow is considered as laminar and the velocity varies linearly with distance from the wall
- No slip condition: u = v = 0.
- In this we are applying the “wall functions” instead of the mesh points.

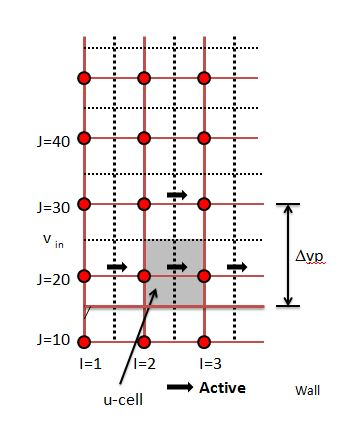
Fig.6 u-velocity cell at a physical boundary

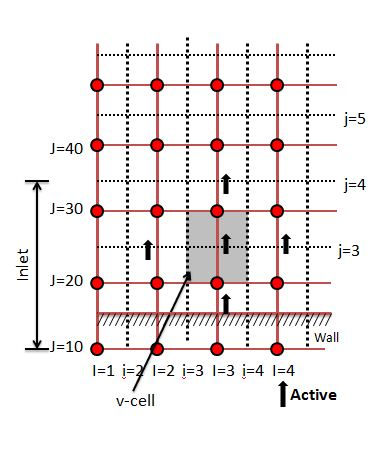
Fig.7 v-cell at physical boundary j=3

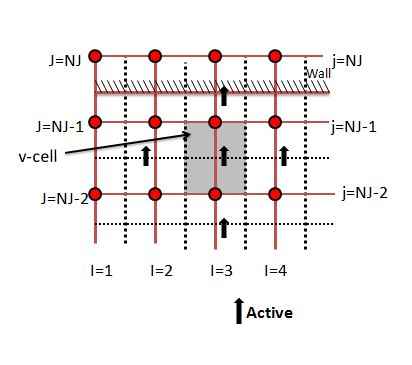
Fig.8 v-cell at physical boundary j=NJ

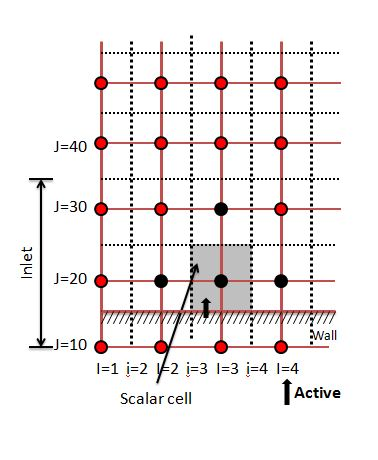
Fig.9 scalar cell at a physical boundary

Turbulent flow:

$y^+ > 11.63\,$.

in the log-law region of a turbulent boundary layer.

Laminar flow :

$y^+ < 11.63\,$.

Important points for applying wall functions:

- The velocity is constant along parallel to the wall and varies only in the direction normal to the wall.
- No pressure gradients in the flow direction.
- High Reynolds number
- No chemical reactions at the wall

== Cyclic boundary condition ==
- We take flux of flow leaving the outlet cycle boundary equal to the flux entering the inlet cycle boundary
- Values of each variable at the nodes at upstream and downstream of the inlet plane are equal to values at the nodes at upstream and downstream of the outlet plane.

== Pressure boundary condition ==
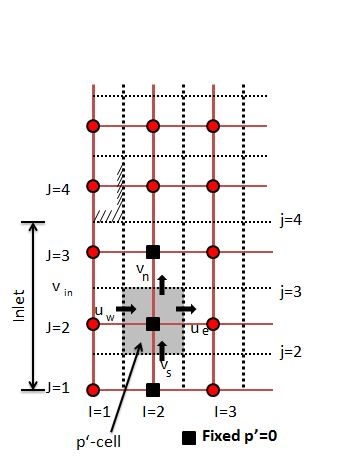
Fig.10 p’-cell at an intake boundary

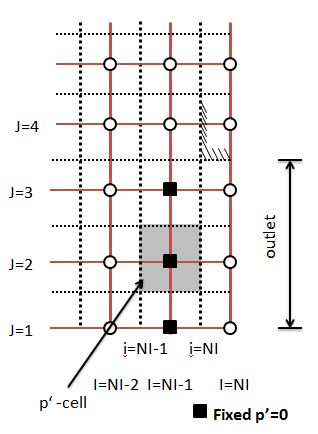
Fig. 11 p’-cell at an exit boundary

These conditions are used when we don’t know the exact details of flow distribution but boundary values of pressure are known

For example: external flows around objects, internal flows with multiple outlets, buoyancy-driven flows, free surface flows, etc.

- The pressure corrections are taken zero at the nodes.

== Exit boundary conditions ==
Considering the case of an outlet perpendicular to the x-direction -

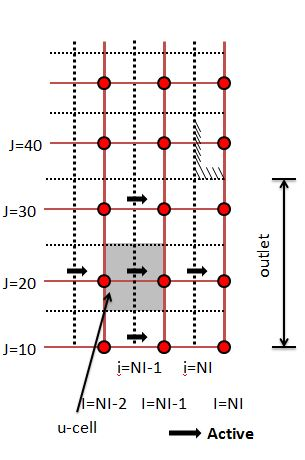
Fig.12 A control volume at an exit boundary

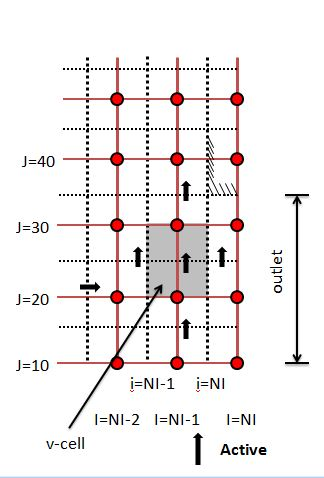
Fig. 13 v-control volume at an exit boundary

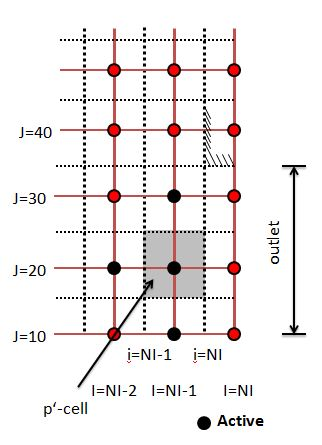
Fig. 14 pressure correction cell at an exit boundary

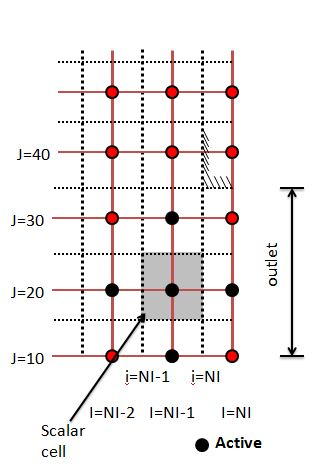
Fig.15 scalar cell at an exit boundary

In fully developed flow no changes occurs in flow direction, gradient of all variables except pressure are zero in flow direction

The equations are solved for cells up to NI-1, outside the domain values of flow variables are determined by extrapolation from the interior by assuming zero gradients at the outlet plane

The outlet plane velocities with the continuity correction

$U_{NI,J} = U_{NI-1,J}\frac{M_{in}}{M_{out}}\,$.
