= Frontiers in Heat and Mass Transfer =

- Discipline: Heat transfer Mass transfer
- Language: English
- Edited by: Chun Yang

Publication details
- History: 2010–present
- Publisher: Tech Science Press
- Frequency: Bimonthly
- Open access: Yes
- License: CC-BY-3.0

Standard abbreviations
- ISO 4: Front. Heat Mass Transf.

Indexing
- ISSN: 2151-8629

Links
- Journal homepage; Editorial Board

Frontiers in Heat and Mass Transfer is a peer-reviewed open access scientific journal covering heat transfer and mass transfer. It is published by Tech Science Press and the editor-in-chief is Chun Yang of Nanyang Technological University.

== Abstracting and indexing ==
The journal is abstracted and indexed in Emerging Sources Citation Index, Ei Compendex, and Scopus.
