= Physics of Fluids =

- Discipline: Fluid dynamics
- Language: English
- Edited by: Savvas Hatzikiriakos and Gerald Fuller

Publication details
- History: 1958–present
- Publisher: AIP Publishing (United States)
- Frequency: Monthly
- Impact factor: 3.8 (2025)

Standard abbreviations
- ISO 4: Phys. Fluids

Indexing
- CODEN: PHFLE6
- ISSN: 1070-6631 (print); 1089-7666 (web)

Links
- Journal homepage

Physics of Fluids is a monthly peer-reviewed scientific journal covering fluid dynamics. Established by the American Institute of Physics in 1958 and currently published by AIP Publishing. The journal focus is the dynamics of gases, liquids, and complex or multiphase fluids—and the journal contains original research resulting from theoretical, computational, and experimental studies.

== History ==
From 1958 through 1988, the journal included plasma physics. From 1989 until 1993, the journal split into Physics of Fluids A covering fluid dynamics, and Physics of Fluids B, on plasma physics. In 1994, the latter was renamed Physics of Plasmas, and the former continued under its original name, Physics of Fluids.

The journal was originally published by the American Institute of Physics in cooperation with the American Physical Society's Division of Fluid Dynamics. In 2016, the American Institute of Physics became the sole publisher. From 1985 to 2015, Physics of Fluids published the Gallery of Fluid Motion, containing award-winning photographs, images, and visual streaming media of fluid flow.

With funding from the American Institute of Physics the annual "François Naftali Frenkiel Award" was established by the American Physical Society in 1984 to reward a young scientist who published a paper containing significant contributions to fluid dynamics during the previous year. The award-winning paper was chosen from Physics of Fluids until 2016, but is presently chosen from Physical Review Fluids. Similarly, the invited papers from plenary talks at the annual American Physical Society Division of Fluid Dynamics were formerly published in Physics of Fluids but, since 2016, are now published in either this journal or Physical Review Fluids.

== Reception ==
Physics of Fluids A, Physics of Fluids B, and Physics of Fluids were ranked 3, 4, and 6, respectively, based on their "impact from 1981-2004" within the category of journals on the physics of fluids and plasmas. According to the Journal Citation Reports, the journal has a 2025 impact factor of 3.8.

== Editors-in-chief ==
The following persons are or have been editors-in-chief:

- 1958–1981: François Naftali Frenkiel
- 1982–1997: Andreas Acrivos
- 1998–2015: John Kim, L. Gary Leal
- 2015–2025: Alan Jeffrey Giacomin
- 2025–present: Savvas Hatzikiriakos and Gerald Fuller

== Controversies ==
In 2024, Retraction Watch reported criticism of AIP Publishing's response to concerns about papers on "Sanal flow choking" published in Physics of Fluids and AIP Advances. AIP said in April that it would review the concerns and, in November, said its review of the Physics of Fluids papers was continuing. In August 2025, Physics of Fluids retracted three papers concerning "Sanal flow choking" following post-publication review. The retraction notices expressed concerns about the reliability of the papers' claims or content. Lead author V. R. Sanal Kumar disagreed with the decisions.

In October 2026, Retraction Watch reported that the journal had disclosed the identity of Thomas Harvey, a researcher who had raised concerns about a paper by William K. George and Thomas Johansson, to the paper's authors. Harvey said the authors’ response felt "a bit like a threat" to his career. George denied that it was a threat, saying he intended to warn that published criticism remains on the record. Co-editor-in-chief Savvas Hatzikiriakos apologised for the disclosure, describing it as an oversight and noting that Harvey's original email had not expressly requested confidentiality. AIP Publishing said it was reviewing both the concerns about the paper and their handling.

== See also ==
- List of fluid mechanics journals
