= Pressure-driven flow =

In microfluidics, Pressure-driven flow is a method to displace liquids in a capillary or microfluidic channel using a pressure gradient. The pressure is typically generated pneumatically using compressed gases (e.g., air, nitrogen, or carbon dioxide) or via hydrostatic pressure differences (e.g., gravity). Other mechanisms, such as electric or magnetic fields, drive fluid flow through different physical principles and are not considered pressure-driven flow.

== Physical fundamentals ==
It is known from thermodynamics that conjugated quantities scale in a different manner. Two classes can be distinguished: intensive quantities as temperature T, pressure P and amount of substance N or extensive quantities as entropy S, volume V and chemical potential μ. Extensive quantities scale with system size, whereas the intensive quantities do not. The quantity pressure, for example, is defined as the (differential) quotient of two extensive variables: p=dE/dV (energy E and volume V) and therefore scale independent as the same scaling factors appearing in the nominator as well as the denominator cancel. In microsystems the problem rises that the extremely small volumes are difficult to be controlled. The reason is the predominance of surface effects as surface charges, van-der-Waals forces and entropic effects (e.g. dewetting due to rough surfaces: the restriction in degrees of freedom of molecules penetrating such a surface is entropically more expensive than staying in bulk). Furthermore, the microsystem has to be controlled from a macroscopic human scale.
