= Helen L. Reed =

American aerospace engineer

- Born: 1956 (age 68–69)
- Citizenship: US
- Education: Goucher College; Virginia Tech
- Partner: William Saric
- Scientific career
- Institutions: Langley Research Center; Stanford University; Arizona State University; Sandia National Laboratories; Tohoku University; Texas A&M University

Helen Louise Reed (born 1956) is an American aerospace engineer. Her research interests include hypersonics, energy efficient aircraft, laminar–turbulent transition, and small satellite design. She is a Fellow of the American Society of Mechanical Engineers, American Physical Society, and American Institute of Aeronautics and Astronautics.

== Early life and education ==
Helen Louise Reed was born in 1956 and grew up in Maryland, where both her parents worked at the Aberdeen Proving Ground as mathematicians. She attended Goucher College, then a women's-only college, graduating in 1977. During her summer breaks from school, she interned at Langley Research Center with NASA. For her graduate studies she attended Virginia Tech under the advisorship of Ali H. Nayfeh, participating in a streamlined curriculum that allowed her to graduate with her master's degree in 1980 and her PhD in 1981.

== Career ==
After completing her bachelor's degree, she returned to Langley Research Center to work as an aerospace technologist. She worked on a project to make aircraft more energy efficient. Following her PhD, Stanford University offered her an assistant professorship in 1982 in mechanical engineering. In 1985 she joined the faculty of Arizona State University as an associate professor with a guarantee tenure after three years. She also served as the director of the Aerospace Research Center at Tohoku University and as an associate professor at Sandia National Laboratories.

At ASU Dr. Reed managed the NASA Space Grant program. Under that program, Dr. Reed trained a large number of Aerospace professionals that are nowadays contributing to space efforts across the U.S. space industry. While she was never presented with a formal award for that, her students will forever remain grateful for her passion and contribution in this area.

Reed joined the faculty of Texas A&M University in 2004. She was the head of its department of aerospace engineering from 2004–2008. Her research interests include hypersonics, energy efficient aircraft, laminar–turbulent transition, and small satellite design. Her lab (formerly the ASUSat Lab but now the AggieSat Lab as of 2005) was involved in the launch of the ASUSat in 2000 and DRAGONSat/AggieSat2. She was an editor of the Annual Review of Fluid Mechanics from 1987–2001.

== Awards and honors ==
She was an inaugural recipient of the Presidential Young Investigator Award in 1984. She received the J. Leland Atwood Award from the American Institute of Aeronautics and Astronautics and American Society of Engineering Education in recognition of her services as an engineering educator. In 2008 she was inducted into Virginia Tech College of Engineering's Academy of Engineering Excellence.

She is a fellow or member of several scientific societies, including the American Society of Mechanical Engineers (1997), American Physical Society (2003), and American Institute of Aeronautics and Astronautics (2008).

== Personal life ==
She is married to William Saric, a fellow professor aerospace engineering at Texas A&M. As of 2008, they lived on a 92 acres (37 ha) farm with their horses and dogs.
