= Charles Speziale =

American scientist (1948–1999)

Charles G. Speziale
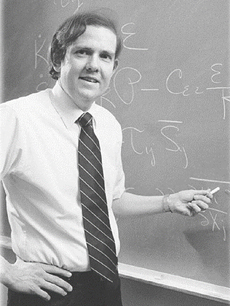
- Born: June 16, 1948; Newark, New Jersey, U.S.
- Died: April 30, 1999 (aged 50); Newton, Massachusetts
- Education: New Jersey Institute of Technology; Rutgers University; Princeton University
- Known for: Turbulence theory, turbulence modelling, non-newtonian fluid flows, turbulence, heat transfer, combustion modelling
- Scientific career
- Fields: Turbulence
- Workplaces: Boston University

Charles Gregory Speziale (June 16, 1948 – April 30, 1999) was an American scientist who had worked in NASA Langley Research Center and a former professor in Department of Aerospace and Mechanical Engineering, Boston University, Massachusetts, US.

== Biography ==
=== Early life ===
Speziale was born on June 16, 1948, in Newark, New Jersey. His father was Peter Speziale. Charles Speziale was the only child in the family.

Speziale attended the Newark College of Engineering (now known as New Jersey Institute of Technology), where he earned a bachelor's degree in civil engineering and applied mathematics in 1970, and a master's degree in engineering mechanics in 1972. He spent the following year at Rutgers University, New Jersey, to study mechanical engineering and continued Ph.D. study in Princeton University. In 1977, he received a Ph.D. degree from Princeton University in New Jersey.

=== Research and teaching ===
Speziale had contributed to fluid mechanics. He had published many articles in turbulence, non-Newtonian fluid mechanics, heat transfer and combustion modelling, and kinetic theory of gases. He had been a scientist in ICASE, NASA Langley Research Center.

Speziale had been a faculty member at Stevens Institute of Technology.

During the years 1993–1999, Speziale taught turbulence and engineering courses in the College of Engineering at Boston University. He had taught graduate courses in turbulence and focused his research on turbulence modeling. His latest work had been published on the turbulence modelling of computing non-equilibrium turbulent flows in complex flows.

Speziale had been an APS fellow in 1997, cited "For the rational analysis and modeling of turbulent flows that has enhanced our ability to compute complex flows of scientific importance". Speziale had been memorialized by many researchers for his original work in his fields, especially in turbulence.
