= Effusive limit =

An effusive limit in ultra-low pressure fluid flow is the limit at which a gas of certain molecular weight is able to expand into a vacuum such as a molecular beam line.
