= François Frenkiel =

- Born: 19 September 1910; Warsaw
- Died: 9 July 1986 (aged 75); Rockville, Maryland
- Education: University of Ghent; University of Lille
- Known for: François Frenkiel Award for Fluid Mechanics
- Scientific career
- Workplaces: Naval Ordnance Laboratory; Johns Hopkins University Applied Physics Laboratory; David W. Taylor Naval Ship Research and Development Center
- Doctoral advisor: Kampé de Fériet

François Naftali Frenkiel (19 September 1910 – 9 July 1986) was a physicist and one of the founders of the American Institute of Physics (AIP) journal Physics of Fluids in 1958. He was the editor of Physics of Fluids from its establishment until 1981.

François Frenkiel, received his undergraduate education in Mechanical and Aeronautical Engineering at the University of Ghent, Belgium, and his Ph.D. in physics from the University of Lille in France where he studied under the direction of Kampé de Fériet. He immigrated to the US in 1947 and was associated successively with Cornell University, the U.S. Naval Ordnance Laboratory, the Johns Hopkins University Applied Physics Laboratory and, from 1960 until his retirement, with the David W. Taylor Naval Ship Research and Development Center.

In addition to being the founder and longtime editor of Physics of Fluids, he served on a large number of national and international committees, e.g., to name but a few, the International Union of Theoretical and Applied Mechanics (IUTAM), the U.S. National Committee on Theoretical and Applied Mechanics, and the Division of Fluid Dynamics of the American Physical Society of which he was the chairman and secretary on numerous occasions.

He published extensively in the field of turbulent flows and pioneered the application of high-speed digital computing methods to the measurement of turbulence and the mathematical modeling of urban pollution. He was elected Fellow of the American Physical Society, the American Geophysical Union, and the American Association for the Advancement of Science. Frenkiel retired in 1981 and died on 9 July 1986, in Washington, D.C.

The American Physical Society has named an award in his honor.
