= Julius Oscar Hinze =

Dutch scientist (1907–1993)

Julius Oscar Hinze (J. O. Hinze in most of his publications, 1907–1993) was a Dutch scientist specialized in fluid dynamics. He was the author of the textbook Turbulence (1959; 1975; US: McGraw-Hill). Throughout his career, he mostly stayed in Delft University of Technology.

The term Hinze scale (sometimes Kolmogorov-Hinze scale) in turbulence research is named after him.

== Publications ==
In chronological order:

- Die Erzeugung von Ringwellen auf einer Flüssigkeitsoberfläche durch periodisch wirkende Druckkräfte (1936)
- Atomization of Liquids by Means of a Rotating Cup (1950)
- Fundamentals of the hydrodynamic mechanism of splitting in dispersion processes (1955)
- The Effect of Compressibility on the Turbulent Transport of Heat in a Stably Stratified Atmosphere (1959)
- Turbulence (with M. S. Uberoi, 1960)
- On the hydrodynamics of turbidity currents (1960)
- Secondary Currents in Wall Turbulence (1967)
- Fine-structure turbulence in the wall region of a turbulent boundary layer (1975)
- Memory effects in turbulence (1975)
- Rotation of the Reynolds' stress tensor in a decaying grid-generated turbulent flow (with P. J. H. Builtjes, 1977)
