= Paul H. Steen =

American engineer

Paul H Steen was an engineer and scientist. He held the Maxwell M. Upson Chair in Engineering at Cornell University. Steen received degrees in engineering and English literature from Brown University, his PhD from Johns Hopkins University, and postdoctoral training at Stanford University.

Steen’s primary area of focus was in the dynamical stability of fluid systems. A team led by Steen discovered a new periodic table classification of droplet motions. Steen co-invented a switchable adhesion device and introduced the Bessemer-meets-Gutenberg innovation to the rapid solidification processing of metallic alloys by planar-flow spin casting. He received awards including the Alexander von Humboldt Fellowship and the Henry Marion Howe Medal and was elected a fellow of the American Physical Society and of the American Institute of Chemical Engineers.

At the time of his death, he served as an associate editor of the Nature journal npj Microgravity. From 2000 to 2012, he was associate editor of the Journal of Fluid Mechanics.

Steen died unexpectedly in Vermont on September 4, 2020.
