= John V. Wehausen =

American applied mathematician

John Vrooman Wehausen
- Born: 23 September 1913; Duluth, Minnesota
- Died: 6 October 2005 (aged 92)
- Education: University of Michigan
- Awards: Georg Weinblum Lectureship (1978–1979); Society of Naval Architects and Marine Engineers, Davidson Medal (1984); American Society of Mechanical Engineers, International Lifetime Achievement Award
- Scientific career
- Fields: Marine hydrodynamics
- Workplaces: University of California, Berkeley
- Doctoral advisor: T. H. Hildebrandt
- Doctoral students: Ronald W. Yeung, R. Cengiz Ertekin

John Vrooman Wehausen (23 September 1913 – 6 October 2005) was an American applied mathematician considered to be one of the world's leading researchers and pioneers in the field of marine hydrodynamics.

His contributions were in the area of ship waves, ship maneuverability, floating systems in waves, and ship-generated solitary waves. In 1960, he and Edmund V. Laitone published the comprehensive review article Surface Waves, which to this day is still an important resource for understanding the dynamics of water waves. Wehausen was emeritus professor of engineering science at the University of California, Berkeley.

== Education and career ==
Wehausen matriculated at the University of Michigan where he earned B.S. (1934) and Ph.D. degrees in mathematics (1938) as well as an M.S. in physics (1935). In 1937, Wehausen began his first teaching position as an instructor in mathematics at Brown University. After Brown, Wehausen spent teaching stints at Columbia University and the University of Missouri before working for the U.S. Navy during World War II in operations research. He joined the David Taylor Model Basin as a mathematician, and during his three-year tenure there, he met Georg P. Weinblum, the German ship hydrodynamicist. His interest in water-wave theory and ship hydrodynamics can be traced to that period. He was an editor of the Annual Review of Fluid Mechanics from 1970–1976.

In 1956, Wehausen accepted a position at the University of California, Berkeley, where he taught until 1984 and where he remained an active researcher thereafter. At Berkeley, Wehausen helped establish the Department of Naval Architecture in 1958 with support from the Office of Naval Research. At the time, only three other U.S. institutions—Massachusetts Institute of Technology, the University of Michigan and the Webb Institute—offered accredited degree programs in naval architecture.

In 2002, a Special Symposium during the Offshore Mechanics and Arctic Engineering Conference in Oslo, Norway was organized as a tribute to Wehausen.

In 2006, a John V. Wehausen Memorial Endowment was established at the UC Berkeley Foundation to provide a scholarship for graduate study in Wehausen's areas of professional interest.

== Personal ==
Wehausen loved languages, music, and literature. He was proficient in a number of languages and also was an accomplished musician.

== Selected publications ==
- Wehausen, J. V. & Laitone, E. V. (1960), Flügge, S. & Truesdell, C. (eds.), "Surface Waves", Encyclopaedia of Physics, 9, Springer Verlag: 446–778, archived from the original on 2013-05-21
- Wehausen, J. V. (1971), "The Motion of Floating Bodies", Annual Review of Fluid Mechanics, 3: 237–268, Bibcode:1971AnRFM...3..237W, doi:10.1146/annurev.fl.03.010171.001321
- Wehausen, J. V. (1973), "The wave resistance of ships", Advances in Applied Mechanics, vol. 13, pp. 93–245, doi:10.1016/S0065-2156(08)70144-3, ISBN 9780120020133
