= Ronald W. Yeung =

Hong Kong professor (born 1945)

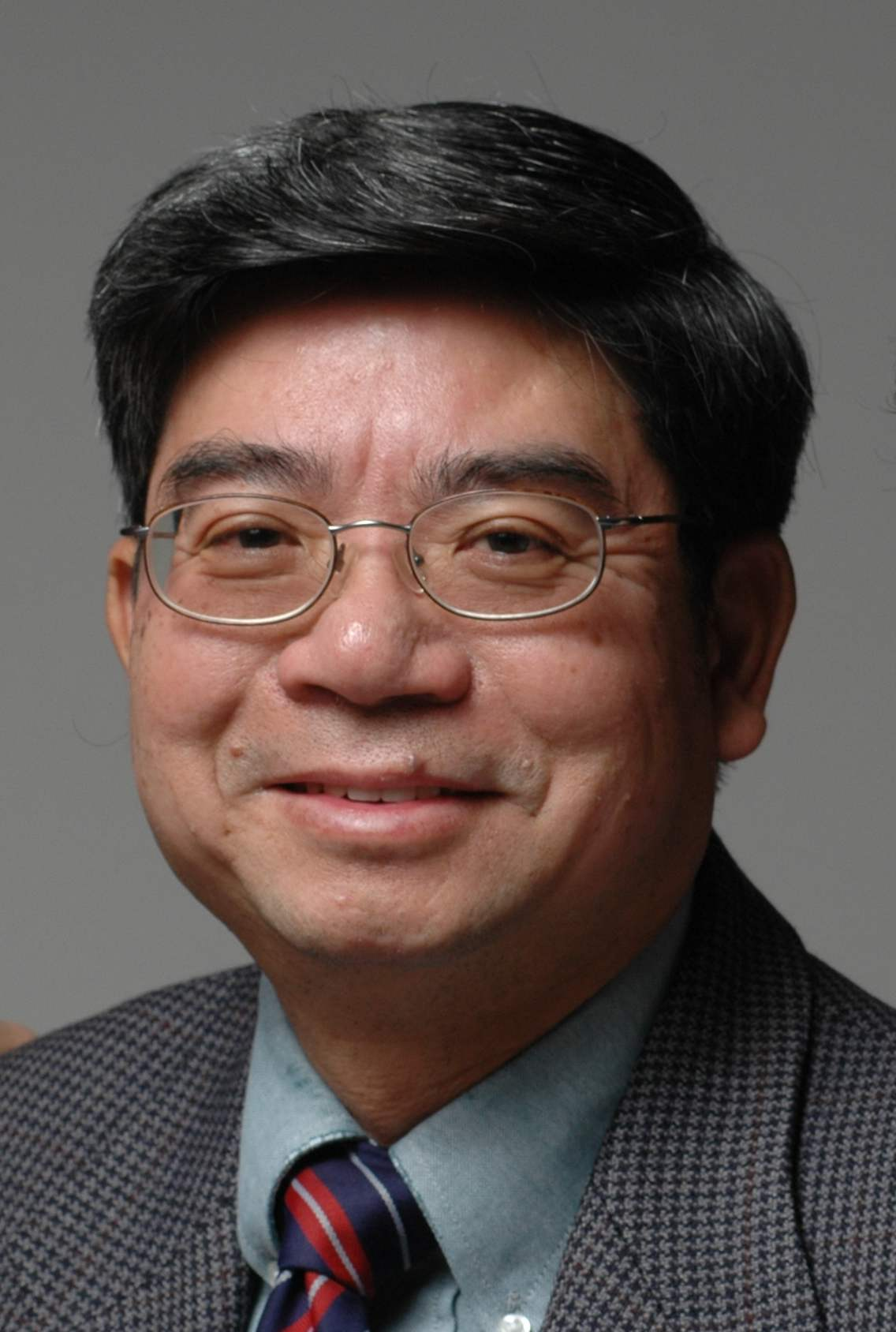
- (2002)
- Born: 1945 (age 80–81); Hong Kong, B.C.C.
- Education: University of California, Berkeley
- Awards: American Bureau of Shipping Endowed Chair in Ocean Engineering (2012); Harbin Engineering University, Honorary Professorship (2010); Sociedade Brasileira de Engenharia Naval (SOBENA), International Award (2008); Society of Naval Architects and Marine Engineers, Kenneth Davidson Medal (2004); Georg Weinblum Memorial Lectureship (2002-2003); Humboldt Prize of the Alexander von Humboldt Foundation (1988, 1998); Fulbright-Hays Senior Scholar of the Australian-American Educational Foundation (1981)
- Scientific career
- Fields: Marine hydrodynamics, Ocean Mechanics
- Workplaces: University of California, Berkeley
- Doctoral advisor: John V. Wehausen

Ronald W. Yeung (born 1945) is a Distinguished Professor of Hydromechanics and Ocean Engineering at the University of California, Berkeley. He is one of the pioneers in the field of numerical ship hydrodynamics and marine renewable energy.

== Education and career ==
Ronald W. Yeung received his B.S. (1968), M.S. (1970), and Ph.D. (1973) degrees from the University of California, Berkeley. He was awarded the University Medal as the most distinguished graduate of the Class of 1968. Prior to his Ph.D. studies, from 1970–71, he staffed at Litton Ship Systems, Culver City, CA (a division of Litton Industries) as a naval architect, and was involved in the design of several classes of naval vessels. During this period, he also taught part-time as a UCLA Extension instructor at the Long Beach Naval Shipyard. His academic career started at the Massachusetts Institute of Technology where, from 1973 to 1982, he was an assistant, then associate professor with tenure, in the Ocean Engineering Department. He joined the engineering faculty of UC Berkeley in 1982. From 1989 to 1996, he served as the chair of the Department of Naval Architecture and Offshore Engineering. Since 1996, he has been appointed Distinguished Professor of Hydromechanics and Ocean Engineering in the department of Mechanical Engineering. He was Visiting Scientist/Professor at The University of Adelaide, South Australia (1981); Technical University of Hamburg (1988); Institute of Applied Mechanics, Kyushu University (1998); Gerhard Mercator University of Duisburg. Germany (1998); and the Centre for Ships and Ocean Structures, Norwegian University of Science & Technology, Trondheim (2007). On June 22, 2012, he was appointed the Inaugural Faculty Holder of the American Bureau of Shipping Endowed Chair in Ocean Engineering at UC Berkeley. A special symposium on ship and offshore hydrodynamics was held by ASME-OMAE2012 in Rio de Janeiro in honor of his contributions in these fields.

Professor Ronald Yeung teaches fluid mechanics, marine hydrodynamics, ocean-environment mechanics, and computational methodologies for marine problems. His publications span a broad range of topics in the marine areas, from fundamentals to design issues. In recent time, his research interests have focused on safety issues of marine vehicles, "green ship" by design, and renewable energy from tidal current, floating offshore winds, and ocean waves. He has provided mentorship to a large number of students and researchers in ocean-related fields. He served on the advisory boards of several ocean-related entities, including those at Delft Technical University, University of Michigan, Massachusetts Institute of Technology, and the Transportation Research Board of the US National Academy of Sciences. He is the Conference Chair of the 12-symposia ASME-33rd International Conference on Offshore Mechanics & Arctic Engineering (OMAE-2014) in San Francisco, June 8–13, 2014.
