= Alan Jeffrey Giacomin =

Canadian professor of chemical engineering

- Born: 1 April 1959 (age 67); Kingston, Ontario, Canada
- Education: McGill University (Ph.D., 1987); Queen's University (M.Sc., 1983), (B.Sc. Honours, 1981)
- Scientific career
- Fields: Chemical Engineering; Rheology; Mechanical Engineering; Materials Science and Engineering; Non-Newtonian fluids Polymer engineering Plastics extrusion Nonlinear Viscoelasticity
- Workplaces: Queen's University
- Doctoral advisor: John Michael Dealy

Alan Jeffrey Giacomin (born April 1, 1959, in Kingston, Ontario, Canada) is a professor of chemical engineering at Queen's University in Kingston, Ontario, and cross-appointed in the Department of Mechanical & Materials Engineering, and of Physics, Engineering Physics, and Astronomy. He was editor-in-chief of Physics of Fluids from 2016 to mid-2025. He holds the Tier 1 Canada Research Chair in Rheology from the Canadian government's Natural Sciences and Engineering Research Council. Since 2017, Giacomin has been President of the Canadian Society of Rheology.

== Education ==
Giacomin graduated from St. Thomas High School (Quebec) in Pointe-Claire, Quebec. He later went to Queen's University and completed a B.Sc. Honours in chemical engineering in 1981. He then completed a M.Sc. in chemical engineering in 1983 at Queen's University. Following this, Giacomin joined Professor John Dealy's group at McGill University and completed a Ph.D. in chemical engineering in 1987.

== Career ==
He has been a faculty member in Mechanical Engineering at Texas A&M University and at the University of Wisconsin-Madison. At the University of Wisconsin-Madison, he directed the Rheology Research Center for 20 years. He has held visiting professorships in North America, Europe, and Asia at: Université de Sherbrooke, McGill University, École Polytechnique Fédérale de Lausanne, École des Mines de Paris, the National University of Singapore, Chung Yuan University, National Yunlin University of Science and Technology, University of Crete, Shandong University, Shanghai University, Peking University and King Mongkut's University of Technology North Bangkok.

He has served The Society of Rheology as associate editor for business for the Journal of Rheology. In October 2016 he gave the keynote lecture for Rheology of Complex Fluids at the 66th Annual Canadian Chemical Engineering Conference. Giacomin holds Professional Engineer status in Wisconsin and Ontario.

== Research ==
Professor Giacomin and his group have published on the rheology of polymeric liquids, and especially on their behaviours in large-amplitude oscillatory shear flow (LAOS) (see Self-assembly of nanoparticles). Specifically, Giacomin has explored the role of polymer orientation in LAOS. Giacomin developed the conversions from standardized polymer durometer hardness to Young's modulus using linear elastic indentation mechanics.

== Honours and awards ==
- Tier 1 Canada Research Chair in Rheology, 2014–present
- Honorary Associate Member of the Institute of Non-Newtonian fluid Mechanics in Wales
- Member of the Fluid dynamics Division of the American Physical Society
- Professor of the French Academy of Sciences
- Former president of The Society of Rheology
- Editor-in-chief, Physics of Fluids, 2016–present
