= Free-surface modelling =

Numerical modeling technique in fluid dynamics

In computational fluid dynamics, free-surface modelling (FSM) refers to the numerical modelling of a free surface—a freely moving interface between immiscible fluids—in order to be able to track and locate it.

Common methods used in free-surface modelling include interface-capturing approaches such as the level-set method and the volume of fluid method, as well as interface-tracking and mesh-based techniques such as Lagrangian prediction–correction schemes and arbitrary Lagrangian–Eulerian formulations, including surface-height (free-surface elevation) methods.

== Free-surface modelling ==
Free-surface modelling is a sub-discipline of computational fluid dynamics (CFD) and hydraulics concerned with the numerical simulation of liquids where the interface between the fluid and a gas (usually air) is free to move. Unlike internal flows in pipes, the boundary of a free surface is not fixed by the geometry of the container but is determined by the balance of forces within the fluid and gravity.

== Overview ==
In free-surface flow, the position of the interface is one of the unknowns that must be solved. The most common examples include waves in the ocean, the flow of water in a river, or the sloshing of fuel in a tank. The primary challenge in modelling these systems is tracking or capturing the moving boundary accurately while maintaining mass conservation.

== Mathematical Formulation ==
Free-surface models are typically governed by the Navier–Stokes equations. For shallow applications, such as coastal engineering or flood routing, the Saint-Venant equations are often used to reduce computational complexity by assuming the vertical pressure distribution is hydrostatic.

The boundary condition at the surface usually requires that:

1. Kinematic condition: No fluid particles cross the surface.
2. Dynamic condition: The pressure at the surface is equal to the atmospheric pressure (neglecting surface tension in large-scale models).

== Numerical Methods ==
There are two primary approaches to handling the moving interface:

== Interface Tracking ==
This method uses a moving mesh that deforms to follow the free surface.

- Pros: Very accurate representation of the boundary.
- Cons: Struggles with large deformations, such as breaking waves or splashing, where the mesh can become highly distorted.

== Interface Capturing ==
This method uses a fixed grid (Eulerian approach) and calculates the shape of the surface based on the fluid's properties within the cells. Common techniques include: [4]

- Volume of Fluid (VOF): Tracks the fraction of fluid in each cell. It is robust and excellent at maintaining mass conservation.
- Level-Set Method: Uses a distance function to define the interface, providing a smooth surface but often requiring "reinitialization" to prevent mass loss.
- Smoothed-Particle Hydrodynamics (SPH): A mesh-free method where the fluid is represented by discrete particles, making it ideal for highly fragmented flows like dam breaks.

== Applications ==
- Coastal Engineering: Predicting storm surges, tsunamis, and wave-structure interactions.
- Environmental Fluid Mechanics: Modelling oil spills, sediment transport, and river flooding.
- Industrial Design: Simulating the pouring of molten metal, ink-jet printing, and ship hull resistance.
- Aerospace: Analyzing fuel sloshing in rocket tanks during maneuvers.
