= Magma (disambiguation) =

Magma is molten rock found under the Earth's surface.

Magma may also refer to:

== Characters ==
- Magma (character), a Marvel Comics character
- Magma (Jonathan Darque), a supervillain enemy of Spider-Man
- Magma (Dr. Stone), a character in the manga series Dr. Stone
- Magma, a character in the anime Spider Riders
- Magma (Gorath), a fictional character featured in the film Gorath
- Alien Magma, an Ultra Seijin (fictional alien)
- Team Magma, a fictional villainous team from Pokémon Ruby, and Pokémon Emerald, and Pokémon Omega Ruby

== Mathematics and computing ==
- Magma (algebra), an algebraic structure consisting of a set together with a binary operation
- Magma (cipher), the codename for GOST 28147-89 symmetric key block cipher
- Magma (company), a developer of software for simulating casting processes
- Magma Communications, a defunct Ottawa-based ISP acquired in early 2004 by Primus Canada
- Magma (computer algebra system), a software package for solving mathematical problems
- MagmaFS, an experimental filesystem for Linux and BSD kernels based on distributed hash tables
- Category of magmas, with magmas as objects and morphisms given by homomorphisms of operations

== Music ==
- Magma (band), a French experimental progressive rock band
- Magma (Magma album), 1970 album
- Magma (Gojira album), 2016 album
- "Magma", a song by the 3rd and the Mortal from the album Painting on Glass
- "Magma", a song by King Gizzard & the Lizard Wizard from Ice, Death, Planets, Lungs, Mushrooms and Lava

== Places ==
- Magma, Arizona, U.S.
- Magma, Nepal

== Other ==
- Magma Design Automation, an electronic design automation software company
- Magma (fly), a genus of flies in the family Muscidae
- Magma (philosophy), a mode of Being in Cornelius Castoriadis' ontological paradigm
- Magma Poetry, better known as Magma, a London-based poetry magazine, publishing work on and about poetry, and known for appointing a different editor every issue
- Magma: Volcanic Disaster, a 2006 television film
- Magma, a 2007 novel by Thomas Thiemeyer
- Magma Aviation, a freight airline

== See also ==
- Magmar (disambiguation)
