= Marker-and-cell method =

The marker-and-cell method is commonly used in computer graphics to discretize functions for fluid and other simulations. It was developed by Francis Harlow and his collaborators at the Los Alamos National Laboratory. The method uses a staggered grid, with the pressure stored at the center of each cell and each velocity component at the middle of the cell faces across which it flows.

== See also ==
- Immersed boundary methods
- Stochastic Eulerian Lagrangian Methods
- Stokesian dynamics
- Volume of fluid method
- Level-set method
