= Free surface =

Surface of a fluid that is subject to zero parallel shear stress

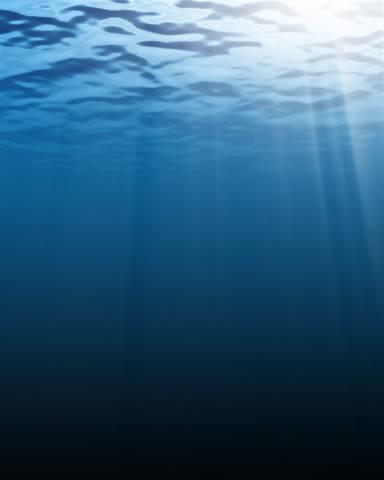
Disturbed free surface of a sea, viewed from below

In physics, a free surface is the surface of a fluid that is subject to zero parallel shear stress, such as the interface between two homogeneous fluids. An example of two such homogeneous fluids would be a body of water (liquid) and the air in the Earth's atmosphere (gas mixture). Unlike liquids, gases cannot form a free surface on their own. Fluidized/liquified solids, including slurries, granular materials, and powders may form a free surface.

A liquid in a gravitational field will form a free surface if unconfined from above. Under mechanical equilibrium this free surface must be perpendicular to the forces acting on the liquid; if not there would be a force along the surface, and the liquid would flow in that direction. Thus, on the surface of the Earth, all free surfaces of liquids are horizontal unless disturbed (except near solids dipping into them, where surface tension distorts the surface in a region called the meniscus).

In a free liquid that is not affected by outside forces such as a gravitational field, internal attractive forces only play a role (e.g. Van der Waals forces, hydrogen bonds). Its free surface will assume the shape with the least surface area for its volume: a perfect sphere. Such behaviour can be expressed in terms of surface tension. It can be demonstrated experimentally by observing a large globule of oil placed below the surface of a mixture of water and alcohol having the same density so the oil has neutral buoyancy.

== Flatness ==
Flatness refers to the shape of a liquid's free surface. On Earth, the flatness of a liquid is a function of the curvature of the planet, and from trigonometry, can be found to deviate from true flatness by approximately 19.6 nanometers over an area of 1 square meter, a deviation which is dominated by the effects of surface tension. This calculation uses Earth's mean radius at sea level, however a liquid will be slightly flatter at the poles. Over large distances or planetary scale, the surface of an undisturbed liquid tends to conform to equigeopotential surfaces; for example, mean sea level follows approximately the geoid.

== Waves ==
If the free surface of a liquid is disturbed, waves are produced on the surface. These waves are not elastic waves due to any elastic force; they are gravity waves caused by the force of gravity tending to bring the surface of the disturbed liquid back to its horizontal level. Momentum causes the wave to overshoot, thus oscillating and spreading the disturbance to the neighboring portions of the surface. The velocity of the surface waves varies as the square root of the wavelength if the liquid is deep; therefore long waves on the sea go faster than short ones. Very minute waves or ripples are not due to gravity but to capillary action, and have properties different from those of the longer ocean surface waves, because the surface is increased in area by the ripples and the capillary forces are in this case large compared with the gravitational forces. Capillary ripples are damped both by sub-surface viscosity and by surface rheology.

== Rotation ==
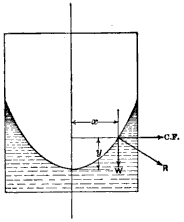
Free surface of a liquid in a rotating vessel is a paraboloid

If a liquid is contained in a cylindrical vessel and is rotating around a vertical axis coinciding with the axis of the cylinder, the free surface will assume a parabolic surface of revolution known as a paraboloid. The free surface at each point is at a right angle to the force acting at it, which is the resultant of the force of gravity and the centrifugal force from the motion of each point in a circle. Since the main mirror in a telescope must be parabolic, this principle is used to create liquid-mirror telescopes.

Consider a cylindrical container filled with liquid rotating in the z direction in cylindrical coordinates, the equations of motion are:

$$\frac{\partial P}{\partial r} = \rho r \omega^2, \quad
\frac{\partial P}{\partial \theta} = 0, \quad
\frac{\partial P}{\partial z} = -\rho g,$$

where $P$ is the pressure, $\rho$ is the density of the fluid, $r$ is the radius of the cylinder, $\omega$ is the angular frequency, and $g$ is the gravitational acceleration. Taking a surface of constant pressure $(dP = 0)$ the total differential becomes

$$dP = \rho r \omega^2 dr - \rho g dz \to \frac{dz_\text{isobar}}{dr} = \frac{r \omega^2}{g}.$$

Integrating, the equation for the free surface becomes

$$z_s = \frac{\omega^2}{2g} r^2 + h_c,$$

where $h_c$ is the distance of the free surface from the bottom of the container along the axis of rotation. If one integrates the volume of the paraboloid formed by the free surface and then solves for the original height, one can find the height of the fluid along the centerline of the cylindrical container:

$$h_c = h_0 - \frac{\omega^2 R^2}{4g}.$$

The equation of the free surface at any distance $r$ from the center becomes

$$z_s = h_0 - \frac{\omega^2}{4g} (R^2 - 2 r^2).$$

If a free liquid is rotating about an axis, the free surface will take the shape of an oblate spheroid: the approximate shape of the Earth due to its equatorial bulge.

== Related terms ==
- In hydrodynamics, the free surface is defined mathematically by the free-surface condition, that is, the material derivative on the pressure is zero:
  $$\frac{Dp}{Dt} = 0.$$
- In fluid dynamics, a free-surface vortex, also known as a potential vortex or whirlpool, forms in an irrotational flow, for example when a bathtub is drained.
- In naval architecture and marine safety, the free surface effect occurs when liquids or granular materials under a free surface in partially filled tanks or holds shift when the vessel heels.
- In hydraulic engineering a free-surface jet is one where the entrainment of the fluid outside the jet is minimal, as opposed to submerged jet where the entrainment effect is significant. A liquid jet in air approximates a free surface jet.
- In fluid mechanics a free surface flow, also called open-channel flow, is the gravity driven flow of a fluid under a free surface, typically water flowing under air in the atmosphere.

== See also ==
- Free surface effect
- Surface tension
- Laser-heated pedestal growth
- Liquid level
- Splash (fluid mechanics)
- Slosh dynamics
- Riabouchinsky solid
- Computational methods for free surface flow
- Water current
