= Flow Science, Inc. =

- Type: Private
- Industry: Computational Fluid Dynamics Software
- Founded: 1980
- Founder: Dr. C.W. "Tony" Hirt
- Headquarters: Santa Fe, New Mexico, USA, United States
- Number of locations: 8
- Area served: North America; South America; Europe; Asia; India; Middle East
- Key people: John Wendelbo, President, Dr. Michael Barkhudarov, Chief Technology Officer
- Products: FLOW-3D, FLOW-3D CAST, FLOW-3D AM, FLOW-3D HYDRO, FLOW-3D WELD, FLOW-3D (x)
- Owner: Dr. Flender Holding GmbH
- Subsidiaries: Flow Science Deutschland, Flow Science Japan, Flow Science China, Flow Science India, Flow Science Latin America, Flow Science Australasia, and Flow Science Mediterranea
- Website: www.flow3d.com

Flow Science, Inc. is a developer of computational fluid dynamics (CFD) software specializing in the simulation of free surface flows. The company's products are based on the volume of fluid method (VOF), pioneered by founder Dr. C.W. "Tony" Hirt while at Los Alamos National Laboratory, and its proprietary TruVOF® implementation. Flow Science serves industries including water resources engineering, metal casting, additive manufacturing, aerospace, and laser welding.

== History ==
The firm was founded by Dr. C. W. "Tony" Hirt, previously a scientist at Los Alamos National Laboratory (LANL). Hirt is known for having pioneered the volume of fluid method (VOF) for tracking and locating the free surface or fluid-fluid interface. T Hirt left LANL and founded Flow Science in 1980 to develop CFD software for industrial and scientific applications using the VOF method .

Flow Science is headquartered in Santa Fe, New Mexico. The company has grown to include wholly-owned subsidiaries in Germany, Japan, China, India, Latin America, Australia, and the Mediterranean region, as well as a network of independent distribution partners across Asia, Europe, the Middle East, and Africa. In 2024, Flow Science opened an East Coast office in Chapel Hill, North Carolina, offering in-person training and workshops.

In December 2021 the holding company Dr. Flender Holding GmbH, of Aachen, Germany, acquired 100% of Flow Science Inc. shares.

== Products ==
The company's products include FLOW-3D, a general-purpose multiphysics CFD solver specializing in free surface flows including phase change, cavitation, and fluid-structure interaction; FLOW-3D CAST, a simulation platform for metal casting processes including mold filling, solidification, and defect prediction; FLOW-3D AM, a simulation tool for additive manufacturing processes including melt pool dynamics across laser powder bed fusion and directed energy deposition; FLOW-3D WELD, a simulation tool for laser welding processes including keyhole dynamics and melt pool behavior; FLOW-3D HYDRO, a CFD solution for water resources and hydraulic infrastructure engineers including spillway design, sediment transport, and dam safety; FLOW-3D POST, an advanced visualization and analysis tool for all FLOW-3D products, built on ParaView; and FLOW-3D (x), a CFD workflow automation and design optimization tool supporting parametric studies and design of experiments.FLOW-3D software uses a fractional areas/volumes approach called FAVOR™ for defining problem geometry, and a free-gridding technique for mesh generation. The software tracks free fluid surfaces using TruVOF®, a proprietary implementation of the volume of fluid method.

More than 2,500 peer-reviewed papers and technical presentations citing FLOW-3D software products have been published across disciplines including water resources engineering, metal casting, additive manufacturing, laser welding, coastal engineering, and aerospace.

Flow Science offers free academic licenses for FLOW-3D, FLOW-3D HYDRO, and FLOW-3D CAST to students, faculty, and post-doctoral researchers at academic institutions worldwide through its FLOW-3D Academic Program.

== Applications ==
=== Water resources and environmental engineering ===
FLOW-3D has been used in peer-reviewed research on energy dissipation in labyrinth weir hydraulics, scour protection for sea-crossing bridge foundations, and reservoir sedimentation and flushing.

=== Metal casting ===
FLOW-3D CAST has been applied in peer-reviewed research on reducing entrapped slag and reoxidation defects in steel castings, transient metal flow and solidification in die casting, and optimization of vacuum die-cast aluminum alloy properties.

=== Additive manufacturing ===
FLOW-3D AM has been used in peer-reviewed research published in Nature Communications on the use of non-contact ultrasound to improve laser additive manufacturing, dislocation evolution during rapid solidification, and phase and property heterogeneities in additively manufactured titanium alloys.

=== Laser welding ===
FLOW-3D WELD has been applied in peer-reviewed research on melt pool dynamics and pore inhibition in laser wire-filling welding, keyhole stability and porosity in aluminum laser welding, and single-crystal-like texture control in laser powder bed fusion of nickel-based superalloys.

=== Aerospace ===
FLOW-3D has been used in peer-reviewed research on large-amplitude liquid sloshing in non-axisymmetric spacecraft tanks, propellant sloshing dynamics in nanosatellite design, and CFD modeling of propellant management devices in cryogenic tanks during parabolic flights.

=== Multiphysics ===
FLOW-3D has been applied in peer-reviewed research across a broad range of multiphysics problems, including the effect of substrate conductivity on sessile droplet evaporation, the settling behavior of non-spherical particles in fluid, and precision micro-edge filleting using large-area electron beam irradiation.

== See also ==
- List of computational fluid dynamics software
- Volume of fluid method
- Magma (company)
