= Zebra analysis =

Diagnostic shading technique

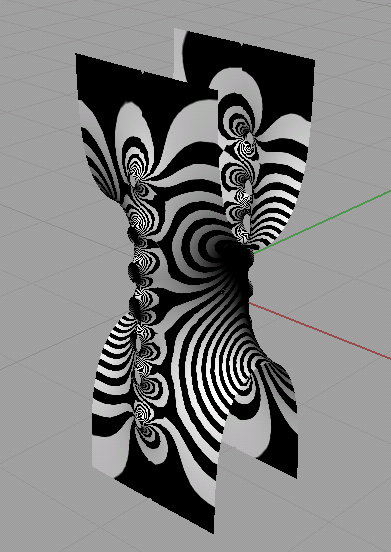
Zebra striped surface.

Zebra analysis, or zebra striping, is a diagnostic shading technique used in computer graphics to visualize curvature on smooth surfaces. It is primarily used for computer-aided design (CAD), where it helps checking that surfaces meet smoothly. It is a simulation of the visual effect of placing an object in a tunnel lit by parallel rows of lights, or a perfectly reflecting object in a room with striped walls.

== Implementation ==
Zebra striping has been implemented in a number of CAD and non-CAD products, including (but not limited to) Fusion 360, Autodesk Inventor, AutoCAD, Rhinoceros 3D, Onshape, and SolidWorks. It can be implemented as an environment map using radiating pie wedges as the source texture.

== See also ==
- Level-set method
