= Casting =

Manufacturing process in which a liquid is poured into a mold to solidify

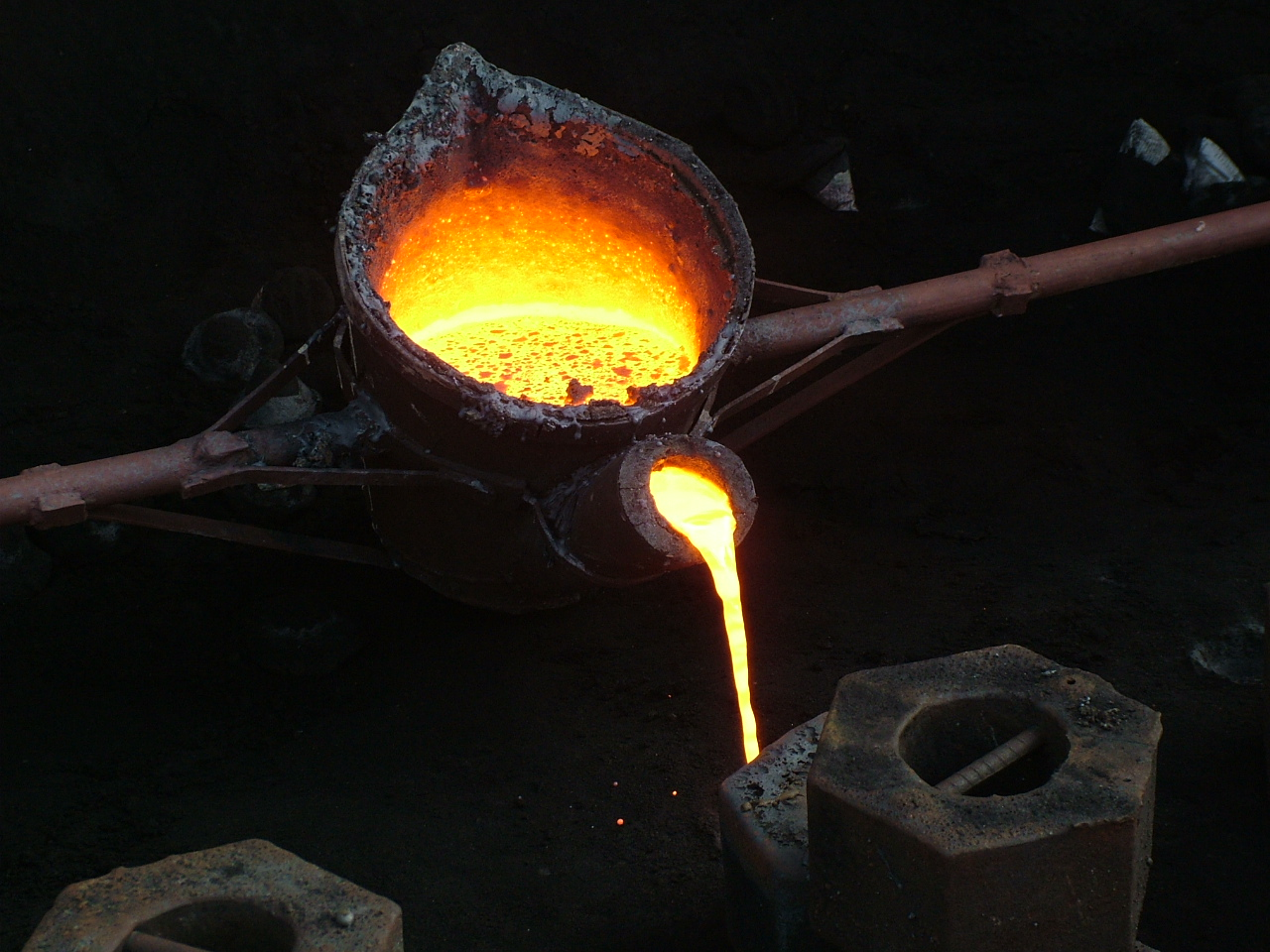
Cast iron casting

Casting is a manufacturing process in which a liquid material is usually poured into a mold, which contains a hollow cavity of the desired shape, and then allowed to solidify. The solidified part is also known as a casting, which is ejected or broken out of the mold to complete the process. Casting materials are usually metals or various time setting materials that cure after mixing two or more components together; examples are epoxy, concrete, plaster and clay. Casting is most often used for making complex shapes that would be otherwise difficult or uneconomical to make by other methods. Heavy equipment like machine tool beds, ships' propellers, etc. can be cast easily in the required size, rather than fabricating by joining several small pieces. Casting is a 7,000-year-old process. The oldest surviving casting is a copper frog from 3200 BC.

== History ==
Throughout history, metal casting has been used to make tools, weapons, and religious objects. Metal casting history and development can be traced back to Southern Asia (China, India, etc). Southern Asian traditions and religions relied heavily on statue and relic castings. These items were frequently made from a copper alloy laced with lead. Since the beginning of metallurgy the majority of castings were simple one- to two-piece molds fashioned from either stone or ceramics. However, there is evidence of lost wax castings in numerous ancient civilizations.

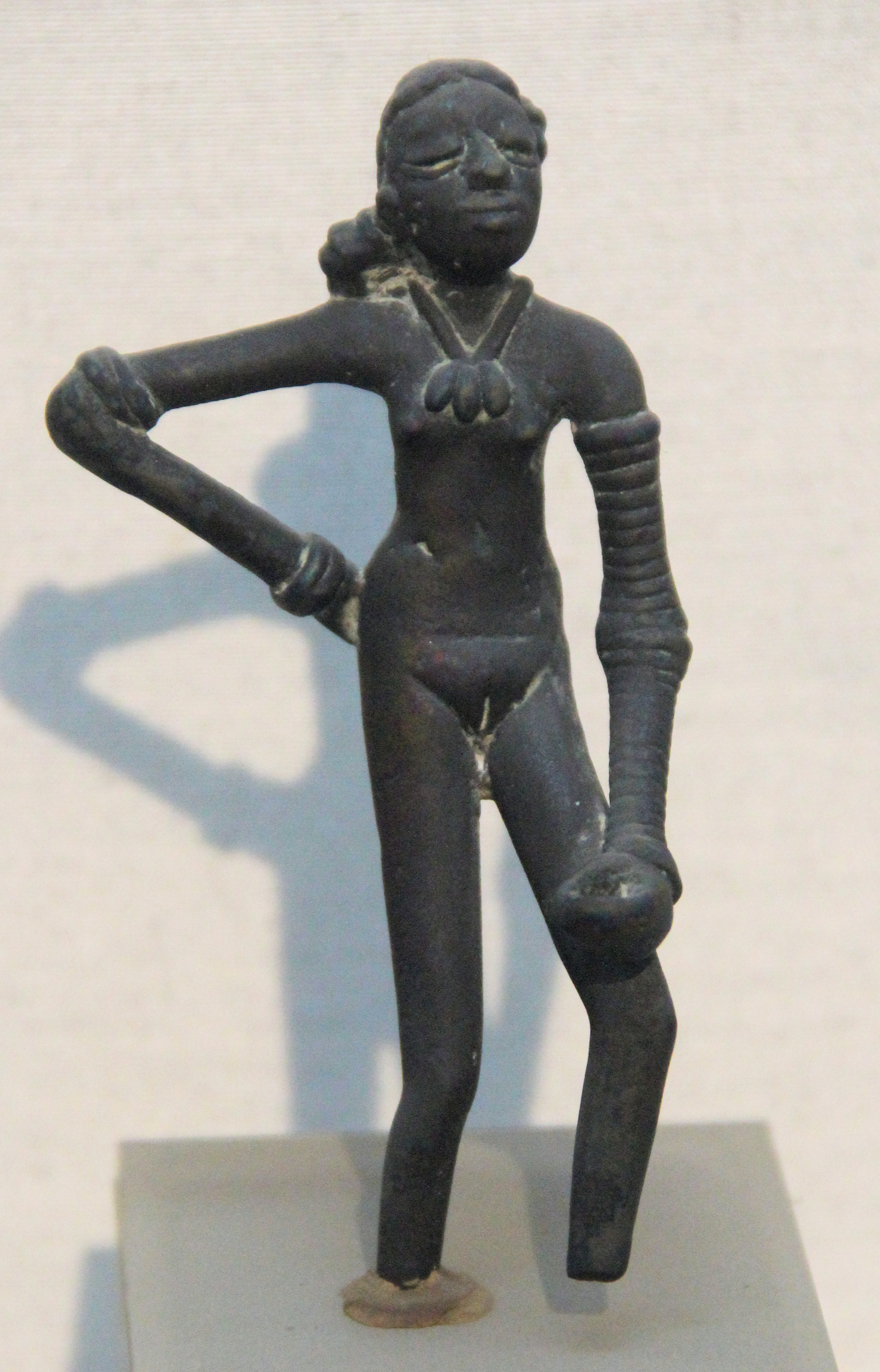
Dancing girl of Mohenjo-daro

The lost wax process originated in ancient Mesopotamia (modern-day Iraq). The earliest known record of lost-wax casting is a clay tablet written in cuneiform in the ancient city of Sparta, Babylon (modern-day Iraq), which specifically records how much wax is needed to cast a key. The earliest-known castings in the global archaeological record were made in open stone molds. There are two types of lost wax methods: direct lost wax method and indirect lost wax method. The direct molding method is to make the wax material into the same wax mold as the casting by hand or other tools; the indirect molding method is to make the wax mold through the mold. The direct molding method requires craftsmen to have a high technical level; otherwise, the quality of castings cannot be guaranteed. However, the limitation of manual direct molding is that its efficiency is too low to achieve mass production. In this regard, indirect moulding has advantages. In indirect moulding, artisans usually make moulds from stone, wood, clay or other plastic materials.

Early civilizations discovered lead aided in the fluidity of molten copper, allowing them to cast more intricate designs. For example, the dancing girl of Mohenjo-daro is a copper alloy casting that most likely utilizes the lost wax technique. Lost wax casting can be dated back to 4000 BC or the Chalcolithic period. One of the oldest studied examples of this technique is a 6,000-year-old amulet from the Indus Valley Civilisation.

India is attributed as one of the first civilizations to use casting methods to mass-produce coins. Around the middle of the first millennium BC (1000 BC – 1 BC), coins used were made from silver, but as the millennium progressed, the coins shifted to a cast copper alloy. New technology was developed to mass-produce the new copper coins. Introduced was a multi-piece, stackable coin template mold. Multiple molds were placed on top of one another into a clay cylinder so molten metal could be poured down the center, filling and solidifying in the open spaces. This process allowed one hundred coins to be produced simultaneously.

In the Middle East and West Africa, the lost wax technique was used very early in their metallurgy traditions, while China adopted it much later. In Western Europe lost wax techniques are considered to have been hardly used especially in comparison to that of the Indus Valley Civilisation. There were no pieces of lost wax found in the capital of Anyang during the Shang dynasty (1600–1040 BC) while a large amount (100,000 pieces) of piece-mould fragments were found. This led to the conclusion that lost wax was not performed in the capital during this dynasty. However, the discovery of a mask made using the investment moulding dated at around 1300 BC indicated that the lost wax technique may have influenced other regions in China.

Historians debate the origin of the development of the cannon, but most evidence points to Turkey and Central Asia in the 18th and 19th century. The casting process of a cannon is a bit more complex with the use of a clay core, a template which has clay moulded around it and then broken out, followed by an assembly in a casting pit that involves binding the casting with iron bands.

== Types ==
=== Metal ===
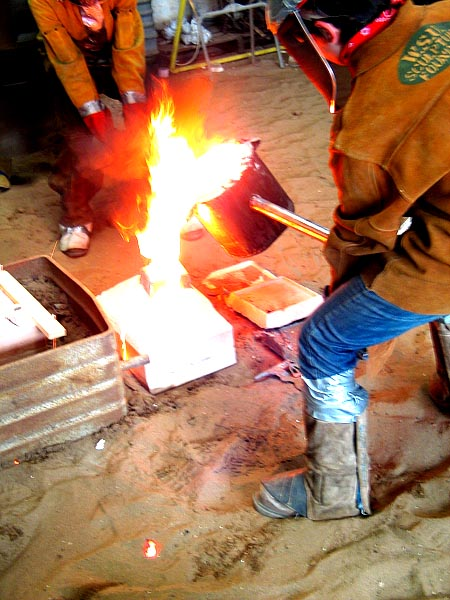
Judenplatz Holocaust Memorial (Nameless Library), by Rachel Whiteread. Concrete cast of books on library shelves turned inside out.

In metalworking, metal is heated until it becomes liquid and is then poured into a mold. The mold is a hollow cavity that includes the desired shape, but the mold also includes runners and risers that enable the metal to fill the mold. The mold and the metal are then cooled until the metal solidifies. The solidified part (the casting) is then recovered from the mold. Subsequent operations remove excess material caused by the casting process (such as the runners and risers).

=== Plaster, concrete, or plastic resin ===
Plaster and other chemical curing materials, such as concrete and plastic resin, may be cast using single-use waste molds as noted above, multiple-use 'piece' molds, or molds made of small rigid pieces or of flexible material such as latex rubber (which is in turn supported by an exterior mold). When casting plaster or concrete, the material surface is flat and lacks transparency. Often topical treatments are applied to the surface. For example, painting and etching can be used in a way that gives the appearance of metal or stone. Alternatively, the material is altered in its initial casting process and may contain colored sand so as to give an appearance of stone. By casting concrete, rather than plaster, it is possible to create sculptures, fountains, or seating for outdoor use. A simulation of high-quality marble may be made using certain chemically-set plastic resins (for example, epoxy or polyester, which are thermosetting polymers) with powdered stone added for coloration, often with multiple colors worked in. The latter is a common means of making washstands, washstand tops and shower stalls, with the skilled working of multiple colors resulting in simulated staining patterns as is often found in natural marble or travertine.

== Fettling ==
Raw castings often contain irregularities caused by seams and imperfections in the molds, as well as access ports for pouring material into the molds. The process of cutting, grinding, shaving or sanding away these unwanted bits is called "fettling" in British English. In modern times robotic processes have been developed to perform some of the more repetitive parts of the fettling process, but historically fettlers carried out this arduous work manually, and often in conditions dangerous to their health. Fettling can add significantly to the cost of the resulting product, and designers of molds seek to minimize it through the shape of the mold, the material being cast, and sometimes by including decorative elements.

== Casting process simulation ==
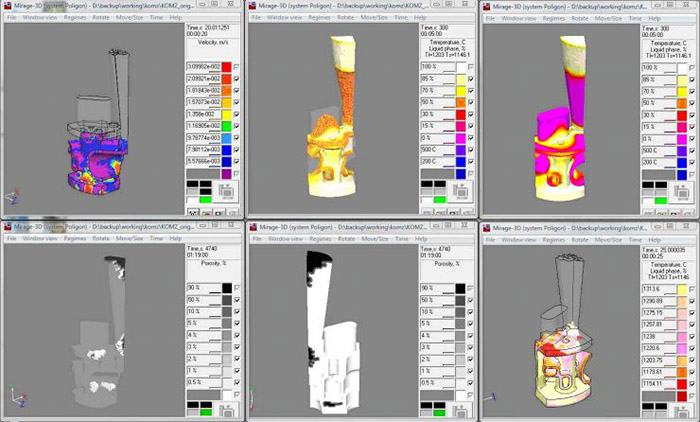
A high-performance software for the simulation of casting processes provides opportunities for an interactive or automated evaluation of results (here, for example, of mold filling and solidification, porosity and flow characteristics).

Casting process simulation uses numerical methods to calculate cast component quality considering mold filling, solidification and cooling, and provides a quantitative prediction of casting mechanical properties, thermal stresses and distortion. Simulation accurately describes a cast component's quality up-front before production starts. The casting rigging can be designed with respect to the required component properties. This has benefits beyond a reduction in pre-production sampling, as the precise layout of the complete casting system also leads to energy, material, and tooling savings.

The software supports the user in component design, the determination of melting practice and casting methoding through to pattern and mold making, heat treatment, and finishing. This saves costs along the entire casting manufacturing route.

Casting process simulation was initially developed at universities starting from the early '70s, mainly in Europe and in the U.S., and is regarded as the most important innovation in casting technology over the last 50 years. Since the late '80s, commercial programs (such as PoligonSoft, AutoCAST and Magma) are available which make it possible for foundries to gain new insight into what is happening inside the mold or die during the casting process.

== See also ==
- Centrifugal casting (industrial) – Casting technique that is typically used to cast thin-walled cylinders
- Core plug – Closure for sand casting core holes on water-cooled internal combustion engine blocks
- Die casting – Metal casting process
- Glass casting – Process for making objects from molten glass
- Investment casting – Industrial process based on lost-wax casting
- Lost-foam casting – Type of evaporative-pattern casting process
- Lost-wax casting – Process by which a duplicate metal sculpture is cast from an original sculpture
- Molding (process) – Shaping a liquid or plastic material by making it conform to a more rigid mold
- Plaster casting (process) – Sand casting process with use of plaster to fill gaps
- Permanent mold casting – Metal casting process that employs reusable molds
- Rapid casting – Rapid prototyping process
- Sand casting – Metal casting process using sand as the mold material
- Slip casting – Technique for forming pottery
- Squeeze casting – Casting method that applies very high pressure to the cooling metal
