= Francis H. Harlow =

American theoretical physicist

Francis Harvey Harlow (22 January 1928 – 1 July 2016) was an American theoretical physicist known for his work in the field of fluid dynamics. He was a researcher at Los Alamos National Laboratory, Los Alamos, New Mexico. Harlow is credited with establishing the science of computational fluid dynamics (CFD) as an important discipline.

He is known for his fundamental contributions to the development of several CFD algorithms for computer simulation of fluid flows, including Particle-In-Cell (PIC), Fluid-In-Cell (FLIC), and Marker-and-Cell (MAC) methods. Harlow was a Fellow of the American Physical Society. He was also a noted expert on the pottery of the Puebloan peoples of New Mexico, publishing in this field as well as in physics, and donated his extensive and significant collection of Puebloan pottery to the Museum of Indian Arts and Culture several years before his death. In 2016, Harlow's autobiography was published in the collection Adventures in Physics and Pueblo Pottery: Memoirs of a Los Alamos Scientist.

== Awards and honors ==
Harlow was a fellow of the American Physical Society since 2003. He was selected "For his contributions to our understanding of low-speed, free-surface, and turbulent flow through computational modeling, and his invention of completely original methods to address these issues." In 2004, he received Los Alamos Medal, the highest honor given to an individual or small group by LANL.

== Selected publications ==
- Harlow, Francis H. (1964). "The particle-in-cell computing method for fluid dynamics". Methods Comput. Phys. 3 (3): 319–343. Bibcode:1964SSRv....3..319B. doi:10.1007/BF00230516. S2CID 121512234.
- Harlow, Francis H.; J. Eddie Welch (1965). "Numerical Calculation of Time-dependent Viscous Incompressible Flow of Fluid with Free Surface" (PDF). Phys. Fluids. 8 (12). American Institute of Physics: 2182–2189. Bibcode:1965PhFl....8.2182H. doi:10.1063/1.1761178.
- Harlow, Francis H.; John P. Shannon (1967). "The Splash of a Liquid Drop". J. Appl. Phys. 38 (10): 3855–3866. Bibcode:1967JAP....38.3855H. doi:10.1063/1.1709031.
- Daly, Bart J.; Francis H. Harlow (1970). "Transport Equations in Turbulence". Phys. Fluids. 13 (11). American Institute of Physics: 2634. Bibcode:1970PhFl...13.2634D. doi:10.1063/1.1692845. Archived from the original on 2011-09-28.
- Harlow, Francis H.; Anthony A. Amsden (1971). "A numerical fluid dynamics calculation method for all flow speeds". J. Comput. Phys. 8 (2). Academic Press: 197–213. Bibcode:1971JCoPh...8..197H. doi:10.1016/0021-9991(71)90002-7.
- Frank, Larry; Francis H. Harlow; Bernard Lopez (2007). Historic Pottery of the Pueblo Indians, 1600-1880. Schiffer Publishing. ISBN 978-0887402272.
