= Volume of fluid method =

Free-surface modelling technique

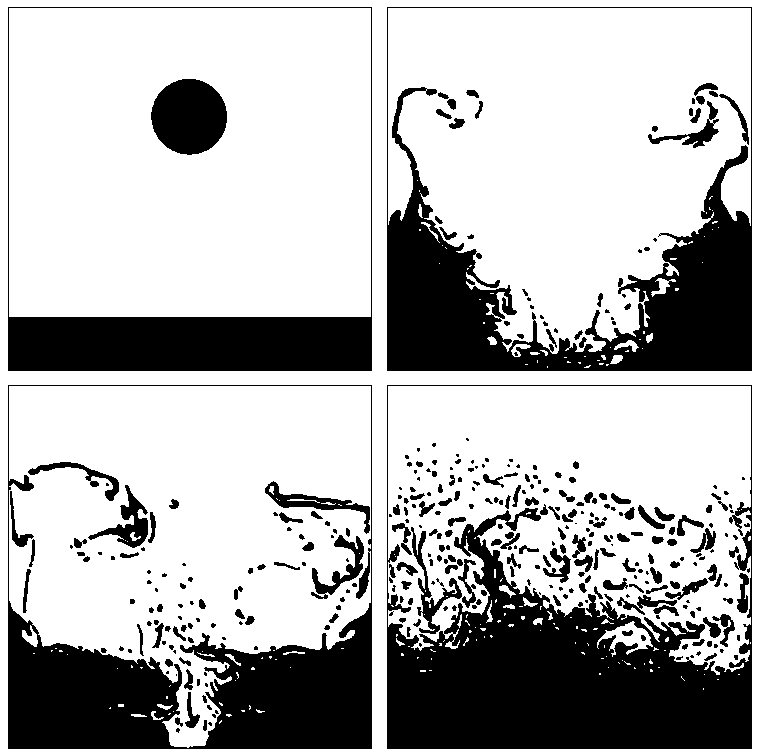
An illustration of fluid simulation using VOF method.

In computational fluid dynamics, the volume of fluid (VOF) method is a family of free-surface modelling techniques, i.e. numerical techniques for tracking and locating the free surface (or fluid–fluid interface). They belong to the class of Eulerian methods which are characterized by a mesh that is either stationary or is moving in a certain prescribed manner to accommodate the evolving shape of the interface. As such, VOF methods are advection schemes capturing the shape and position of the interface, but are not standalone flow solving algorithms. The Navier–Stokes equations describing the motion of the flow have to be solved separately.

== History ==
The volume of fluid method is based on earlier Marker-and-cell (MAC) methods developed at Los Alamos National Laboratory. MAC used Lagrangian marker particles to track the distribution of fluid in a fixed Eulerian grid. The use of marker particles was computationally expensive because it required many marker particles per grid cell, to reduce numerical noise when discrete marker particles move across grid cells. The original idea of the VOF method was to replace marker particles with a single scalar variable per grid cell representing the volume fraction of fluid in it. Thereby, the volume of fluid is governed by an advection equation. This idea arose from studies of two-phase mixture (water and steam) problems where it was customary to use a volume of steam variable. The VOF approach was first demonstrated in a 1975 publication “Methods for Calculating Multi-Dimensional, Transient Free Surface Flows Past Bodies” by Nichols and Hirt. This publication described how to advect the fluid fraction with a Donor-Acceptor scheme, how to estimate the orientation and position of the free surface inside surface cells, and how to prescribe appropriate boundary conditions (continuity and zero shear stress) at the free surface. This approach was much simpler than other techniques tracking the surface of fluid, yet more versatile as it could model the coalescence and breakup of fluid regions. In 1976, Noh & Woodward presented the Simple Line Interface Calculation (SLIC), a technique to approximate fluid interfaces based on volume fractions, designed for directional-split advection scheme of volume fractions. SLIC could also handle an arbitrary number of immiscible fluid phases per grid cells. Thereby, SLIC was well suited to the VOF approach, although the two methods were initially independent and remained separate till the 90s. The term “Volume of Fluid method” and it acronym “VOF” method were coined in the 1980 Los Alamos Scientific Laboratory report, “SOLA-VOF: A Solution Algorithm for Transient Fluid Flow with Multiple Free Boundaries,” by Nichols, Hirt and Hotchkiss and in the journal publication “Volume of Fluid (VOF) Method for the Dynamics of Free Boundaries” by Hirt and Nichols in 1981. These two publications provided more details about the specific procedures used to approximate the position of the free surface (locally represented by an inclined line in surface cells) and apply the free surface boundary conditions on it. Since VOF method surpassed MAC by lowering computer storage requirements, it quickly became popular. Early applications of the SOLA-VOF program developed at Los Alamos include light-water-reactor safety studies. A variant of the SOLA-VOF code was also adopted by NASA. In 1982, Youngs developed the Piecewise-Linear Interface Calculation (PLIC) scheme, which improved accuracy of interface reconstruction upon the SLIC and early VOF methods.

== Overview ==
The method is based on the idea of a fraction function $C$. It is a scalar function, defined as the integral of a fluid's characteristic function in the control volume, namely the volume of a computational grid cell. The volume fraction of each fluid is tracked through every cell in the computational grid, while all fluids share a single set of momentum equations, i.e. one for each spatial direction. From a cell-volume averaged perspective, when a cell is empty of the tracked phase, the value of $C$ is zero; when the cell is full of tracked phase, $C=1$; and when the cell contains an interface between the tracked and non-tracked volumes, $0 < C < 1$. From a perspective of a local point that contains no volume, $C$ is a discontinuous function insofar as its value jumps from 0 to 1 when the local point moves from the non-tracked to the tracked phase. The normal direction of the fluid interface is found where the value of $C$ changes most rapidly. With this method, the free-surface is not defined sharply, instead it is distributed over the height of a cell. Thus, in order to attain accurate results, local grid refinements have to be done. The refinement criterion is simple, cells with $0<C<1$ have to be refined. A method for this, known as the marker and micro-cell method, has been developed by Raad and his colleagues in 1997.

The evolution of the $m$-th fluid in a system on $n$ fluids is governed by the transport equation (actually the same equation that has to be fulfilled by the level-set method distance function $\phi$):

$$\frac{\partial C_{m}}{\partial t} + \mathbf{v}\cdot \nabla C_{m} =0,$$

with the following constraint

$$\sum_{m=1}^{n} C_{m} = 1$$,

i.e., the volume of the fluids is constant. For each cell, properties such as density $\rho$ are calculated by a volume fraction average of all fluids in the cell

$$\rho=\sum_{m=1}^{n} \rho_{m} C_{m}.$$

These properties are then used to solve a single momentum equation through the domain, and the attained velocity field is shared among the fluids.

The VOF method is computationally friendly, as it introduces only one additional equation and thus requires minimal storage. The method is also characterized by its capability of dealing with highly non-linear problems in which the free-surface experiences sharp topological changes. By using the VOF method, one also evades the use of complicated mesh deformation algorithms used by surface-tracking methods. The major difficulty associated with the method is the smearing of the free-surface. This problem originates from excessive diffusion of the transport equation.

== Discretization ==
To avoid smearing of the free-surface, the transport equation has to be solved without excessive diffusion. Thus, the success of a VOF method depends heavily on the scheme used for the advection of the $C$ field. Any chosen scheme needs to cope with the fact that $C$ is discontinuous, unlike e.g. the distance function $\phi$ used in the Level-Set method.

Whereas a first order upwind scheme smears the interface, a downwind scheme of the same order will cause a false distribution problem which will cause erratic behavior in case of the flow is not oriented along a grid line. As these lower-order schemes are inaccurate, and higher-order schemes are unstable and induce oscillations, it has been necessary to develop schemes which keep the free-surface sharp while also producing monotonic profiles for $C$. Over the years, a multitude of different methods for treating the advection have been developed. In the original VOF-article by Hirt, a donor-acceptor scheme was employed. This scheme formed a basis for the compressive differencing schemes.

The different methods for treating VOF can be roughly divided into three categories, namely the donor-acceptor formulation, higher order differencing schemes and line techniques.

=== The Donor-Acceptor Schemes ===
The donor-acceptor scheme is based on two fundamental criteria, namely the boundedness criterion and the availability criterion. The first one states that the value of $C$ has to be bounded between zero and one. The latter criterion ensures that the amount of fluid convected over a face during a time step is less than or equal to the amount available in the donor cell, i.e., the cell from which the fluid is flowing to the acceptor cell. In his original work, Hirt treated this with a blended scheme consisting of controlled downwinding and upwind differencing.

=== Higher Order Differencing Schemes ===
In the higher order differencing schemes, as the name suggests, the convective transport equation is discretized with higher order or blended differencing schemes. Such methods include the Compressive Interface Capturing Scheme for Arbitrary Meshes (CICSAM) and High Resolution Interface Capturing (HRIC) scheme, which are both based on the Normalized Variable Diagram (NVD) by Leonard.

=== Geometrical Reconstruction Techniques ===
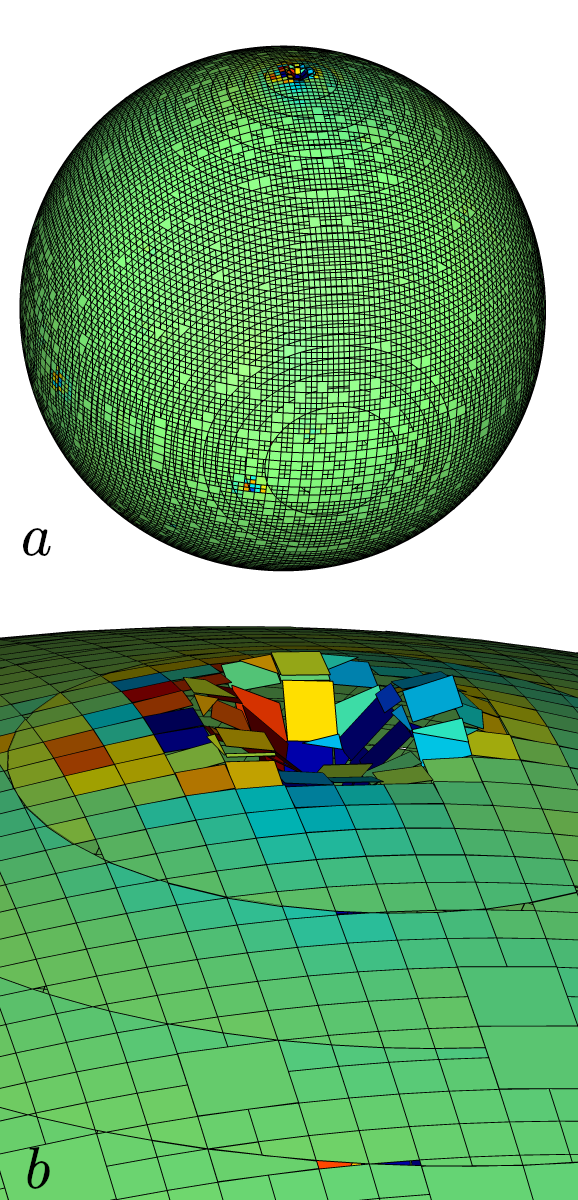
A spherical droplet represented by PLIC (Piecewise Linear Interface Calculation) geometrical reconstruction technique in a VOF simulation; (a) general view, (b) zoom into the cavity region. Reconstruction yields a planar segment in each of the control volumes; the segments are generally discontinuous, which is visible especially in the under-resolved regions.Obtained using the Basilisk code .

Line techniques circumvent the problems associated with the discretization of the transport equation by not tracking the interface in a cell explicitly. Instead, the fluid distribution in a cell an interface is obtained by using the volume fraction distribution of neighbouring cells. The Simple Line Interface Calculation (SLIC) by Noh and Woodward from 1976 uses a simple geometry to reconstruct the interface. In each cell the interface is approximated as a line parallel to one of the coordinate axes and assumes different fluid configurations for the horizontal and vertical movements respectively. A widely used technique today is the Piecewise Linear Interface Calculation by Youngs. PLIC is based on the idea that the interface can be represented as a line in R^{2} or a plane in R^{3}; in the latter case we may describe the interface by:

$$\mathbf{n}_x+\mathbf{n}_y+\mathbf{n}_z=\alpha,$$

where $\mathbf{n}$ is a vector normal to the interface. Components of the normal are found e.g. by using the finite difference method or its combination with least squares optimization. The free term $\alpha$ is then found (analytically or by approximation) by enforcing mass conservation within computational cell. Once the description of the interface is established, the advection equation of $C$ is solved using geometrical techniques such as finding the flux of $C$ between grid cells, or advecting the endpoints of interface using discrete values of fluid velocity.

== Interface capture issues ==
In two-phase flows in which the properties of the two phases are vastly different, errors in the computation of the surface tension force at the interface cause Front-Capturing methods such as Volume of Fluid (VOF) and Level-Set method (LS) to develop interfacial spurious currents. To better solve such flows, special treatment is required to reduce such spurious currents. A few studies have looked at improving interface tracking by combining Level-set method and Volume of fluid methods while a few others have looked at improving the numerical solving algorithm by adding smoothening loops or improving property averaging techniques.

== Software implementations ==
FLOW-3D, developed by Flow Science, Inc., incorporates TruVOF®, a proprietary implementation of the original one-fluid VOF model as described by Hirt and Nichols.

== See also ==
- Immersed boundary method
- Stochastic Eulerian Lagrangian methods
- Level-set method
- Sloshing
