= Rapid casting =

Rapid prototyping process

Rapid casting is a manufacturing approach that uses additive manufacturing to directly produce casting patterns or molds from digital models, thereby integrating 3D printing with conventional casting processes to reduce lead time and enable rapid prototyping of complex metal parts, particularly in aluminium alloys.

== Advantages ==
- Cheap for batch production
- Reduced turnaround time
- Representative prototypes
- Easier to make patterns
- Possibility to make the part lighter by removing unwanted material and stiffer by adding rib features.

=== Advantages of pressure die casting ===
- Cheap at scale
- Large parts
- Good surface finish
- High dimensional accuracy
- High tensile strength

== Procedure ==
- A disposable pattern is 3D printed (can be of wax or any plastic used in 3D printing PLA, PETG, Etc.).
- The pattern, if made of wax, undergoes wax infiltration and other procedures to increase its strength and dewaxing properties.
- A mold is made by coating the printed pattern using a ceramic slurry.
- The pattern is melted out of the ceramic mold.
- Molten metal is poured into mold.
