= Magmar =

Magmar may refer to:

- Magmar (Pokémon), a Pokémon species
- Magmar, one of the Evil Rock Lords in the Rock Lords toy line
