= Stochastic Eulerian Lagrangian method =

In computational fluid dynamics, the Stochastic Eulerian Lagrangian Method (SELM) is an approach to capture essential features of fluid-structure interactions subject to thermal fluctuations while introducing approximations which facilitate analysis and the development of tractable numerical methods. SELM is a hybrid approach utilizing an Eulerian description for the continuum hydrodynamic fields and a Lagrangian description for elastic structures. Thermal fluctuations are introduced through stochastic driving fields. Approaches also are introduced for the stochastic fields of the SPDEs to obtain numerical methods taking into account the numerical discretization artifacts to maintain statistical principles, such as fluctuation-dissipation balance and other properties in statistical mechanics.

The SELM fluid-structure equations typically used are

$$\rho
\frac{d{u}}{d{t}}
= \mu \, \Delta u - \nabla p + \Lambda[\Upsilon(V - \Gamma{u})] + \lambda + f_\mathrm{thm}(x,t)$$

$$m\frac{d{V}}{d{t}} = -\Upsilon(V - \Gamma{u}) - \nabla \Phi[X] + \xi + F_\mathrm{thm}$$

$$\frac{d{X}}{d{t}} = V.$$

The pressure p is determined by the incompressibility condition for the fluid

$$\nabla \cdot u = 0. \,$$

The $\Gamma, \Lambda$ operators couple the Eulerian and Lagrangian degrees of freedom. The $X, V$ denote the composite vectors of the full set of Lagrangian coordinates for the structures. The $\Phi$ is the potential energy for a configuration of the structures. The $f_\mathrm{thm}, F_\mathrm{thm}$ are stochastic driving fields accounting for thermal fluctuations. The $\lambda, \xi$ are Lagrange multipliers imposing constraints, such as local rigid body deformations. To ensure that dissipation occurs only through the $\Upsilon$ coupling and not as a consequence of the interconversion by the operators $\Gamma,\Lambda$ the following adjoint conditions are imposed

$$\Gamma = \Lambda^T.$$

Thermal fluctuations are introduced through Gaussian random fields with mean zero and the covariance structure

$$\langle f_\mathrm{thm}(s)f^T_\mathrm{thm}(t) \rangle = -\left(2k_B{T}\right)\left(\mu \Delta - \Lambda \Upsilon\Gamma\right)\delta(t - s).$$

$$\langle F_\mathrm{thm}(s)F^T_\mathrm{thm}(t) \rangle = 2k_B{T}\Upsilon\delta(t - s).$$

$$\langle f_\mathrm{thm}(s)F^T_\mathrm{thm}(t) \rangle = -2k_B{T}\Lambda\Upsilon\delta(t - s).$$

To obtain simplified descriptions and efficient numerical methods, approximations in various limiting physical regimes have been considered to remove dynamics on small time-scales or inertial degrees of freedom. In different limiting regimes, the SELM framework can be related to the immersed boundary method, accelerated Stokesian dynamics, and arbitrary Lagrangian Eulerian method. The SELM approach has been shown to yield stochastic fluid-structure dynamics that are consistent with statistical mechanics. In particular, the SELM dynamics have been shown to satisfy detailed-balance for the Gibbs–Boltzmann ensemble. Different types of coupling operators have also been introduced allowing for descriptions of structures involving generalized coordinates and additional translational or rotational degrees of freedom. For numerically discretizing the SELM SPDEs, general methods were also introduced for deriving numerical stochastic fields for SPDEs that take discretization artifacts into account to maintain statistical principles, such as fluctuation-dissipation balance and other properties in statistical mechanics.

SELM methods have been used for simulations of viscoelastic fluids and soft materials, particle inclusions within curved fluid interfaces and other microscopic systems and engineered devices.

== See also ==
- Immersed boundary method
- Stokesian dynamics
- Volume of fluid method
- Level-set method
- Marker-and-cell method

== Software : Numerical Codes and Simulation Packages ==
- Mango-Selm : Stochastic Eulerian Lagrangian and Immersed Boundary Methods, 3D Simulation Package, (Python interface, LAMMPS MD Integration), P. Atzberger, UCSB
