= Magma (company) =

Manufacturing software development company

MAGMA Gießereitechnologie GmbH
- Company type: Limited liability company (Gesellschaft mit beschränkter Haftung)
- Founded: 1988
- Headquarters: Aachen, North Rhine-Westphalia, Germany
- Key people: Dr.-Ing. Erwin Flender
- Products: MAGMASOFT® autonomous engineering - Software for the simulation of casting processes
- Number of employees: 250
- Website: www.magmasoft.de www.magmasoft.com

Product logo of MAGMA5

MAGMA Gießereitechnologie GmbH is a developer and supplier of software for casting process simulation.

== Introduction ==
The company was founded in 1988 and has its headquarters in Aachen, Germany. MAGMA's product and service portfolio includes simulation software MAGMASOFT, with the newest release being MAGMASOFT 6.1 autonomous engineering, as well as engineering services for casting design and optimization.

Worldwide, MAGMA employs more than 250 people in software development, support, marketing, and administration, of which 120 are in Aachen. The company also has offices and subsidiaries in the United States, Mexico, Singapore, Brazil, Korea, Turkey, India, China, and the Czech Republic.
