= L. Gary Leal =

American chemical engineer and academic

- Born: March 18, 1943 (age 83)
- Education: University of Washington, Stanford University, Cambridge University
- Scientific career
- Fields: Chemical Engineering, Fluid Dynamics, Dynamics of Complex Fluids
- Workplaces: University of California, Santa Barbara
- Doctoral advisor: Andreas Acrivos
- Doctoral students: Howard A. Stone; Gerald Fuller

Leslie Gary Leal (born March 18, 1943) is the Warren & Katharine Schlinger Professor of Chemical Engineering at the University of California, Santa Barbara, United States. He is known for his research work in the dynamics of complex fluids.

Leal was elected a member of the National Academy of Engineering in 1987 for fundamental contributions to the understanding of the fluid mechanics of particulate systems, polymer solutions, and suspensions.

== Career ==
Leal received his B.S. degree from the University of Washington in 1965, M.S. degree from the Stanford University in 1968, and Ph.D. degree from the Stanford University in 1969; all in chemical engineering. His Ph.D. thesis advisor was Andreas Acrivos. He then spent two years at the University of Cambridge, studying with Professor G. K. Batchelor.

Leal started his academic career in 1970 as an assistant professor in chemical engineering at California Institute of Technology. He became a full professor in 1978. During 1986–1989, he was Chevron Distinguished Professor of Chemical Engineering. In 1989, Leal joined University of California, Santa Barbara as professor and chair in the department of chemical engineering. He is currently the Warren and Katharine Schlinger Professor of Chemical Engineering Emeritus at UCSB.

== Research ==
Leal's research covers a wide range of topics in fluid dynamics, including the dynamics of complex fluids, such as polymeric liquids, emulsions, polymer blends, and liquid crystalline polymers. He also works on large-scale computer simulation of complex fluid flows. Leal and his coworkers made pioneering contributions to the study of drop deformation under different flow conditions. They have developed a scheme based on a finite difference approximation of the equations of motion, applied on a boundary-fitted orthogonal curvilinear coordinate system, inside and outside the drop. Leal has published more than 250 papers on fluid dynamics. He has directed 55 Ph.D. thesis in various topics in fluid dynamics. Several of his students have gone on to become professors at prestigious universities including Howard Stone who is currently at Princeton and Gerald Fuller at Stanford. Leal comes from a long line of researchers that can be traced back from mentor to mentor all the way to Sir Isaac Newton.

== Editorships ==
From 1998–2015 he served as co-editor-in-chief of Physics of Fluids with John Kim.

== Honors and awards ==
- Distinguished Scholar Lecturer, Mechanical and Aerospace Engineering, Arizona State University, October 2006
- Fluid Dynamics Prize, American Physical Society, 2002
- Highly Cited Researchers, Original Member, 100 Most Highly Cited Researchers in Engineering, ISI Thompson Scientific, 2001.
- Bingham Medal, The Society of Rheology, 2001
- John Simon Guggenheim Foundation Fellow, 1976.
- Allan Colburn Memorial Lectureship, department of chemical engineering, University of Delaware, 1978.
- Allan Colburn Award - National AIChE, 1978.
- Fellow of the American Physical Society, 1984.
- Chevron Distinguished Professor of Chem. Engineering, Caltech, April 1986-July 1989.
- Member of the National Academy of Engineering (elected 1987).
- Stanley Corrsin Lectureship in Fluid Mechanics, Dept. of Chem. Eng., The Johns Hopkins University, 1990.
- Stanley Katz Memorial Lectureship in Chemical Engineering, Dept. of Chem. Eng., City College of the City University of New York, 1991.
- Reilly Memorial Lectureship in Chemical Engineering, University of Notre Dame, April 1992.
- William H. Walker Award for Excellence in Contributions to Chemical Engineering Literature, AIChE 1993.
- Robert Pigford Lecturer, University of Delaware, April 1994.
- Julian C. Smith Lecturer, School of Chemical Engineering Cornell University April 1996.
- Co-Editor-in-Chief, Physics of Fluids, 1998-2015.
- NASA Group Achievement Award for MSL-1 Project Team to L.G. Leal, June 30, 1999
- Rutgers Collaboratus X Lecturer, Dept. of Chem. and Biochemical Eng., Rutgers University, April, 2000.
- George K. Batchelor Lecturer in Fluid Mechanics, Department of Applied Mathematics and Theoretical Physics, University of Cambridge, UK, May, 2000.
- NCE Cullimore Memorial Lecturer, NJIT, October 2001
- David M. Mason Lecturer, Dept. Chem. Eng., Stanford University, May 2004.

== Books ==
- L. G. Leal, Laminar Flow and Convective Transport Processes, Butterworth-Heinemann, Stoneham, Massachusetts, 740 pages (1992).
- L. G. Leal, Advanced Transport Phenomena: Fluid Mechanics and Convective Transport Processes, Cambridge University Press, New York (2007).
- L. G. Leal, "Microstructural Rheology of Complex Fluids", Cambridge University Press, New York (2026).
