= Batchelor Prize =

Fluid dynamics research prize in honor of Batchelor

George Batchelor

The Batchelor Prize is an award presented once every four years by the International Union of Theoretical and Applied Mechanics (IUTAM) for outstanding research in fluid dynamics. The prize of $25,000 is sponsored by the Journal of Fluid Mechanics and presented at the International Congress of Theoretical and Applied Mechanics (ICTAM). The research recognised by the Prize will normally have been published during the ten-year period prior to the award to ensure that the work is of current interest.

The award is named in honour of George Batchelor, an Australian applied mathematician and fluid dynamicist.

== Recipients ==
Source: IUTAM

- 2024: Charles Meneveau, Johns Hopkins University
- 2020: Alexander Smits, Princeton University
- 2016: Raymond E. Goldstein, University of Cambridge
- 2012: Detlef Lohse
- 2008: Howard A. Stone

== See also ==
- List of physics awards
- List of prizes named after people
