= Hassan Aref =

Professor of fluid dynamics

- Born: September 28, 1950. Alexandria, Egypt
- Died: September 9, 2011 (aged 60); De Land, Illinois, United States
- Education: University of Copenhagen, Cornell University
- Spouse: Susanne Aref (1974-2011)
- Scientific career
- Fields: Fluid mechanics
- Workplaces: Brown University, University of California, San Diego, University of Illinois at Urbana–Champaign, Virginia Tech
- Thesis: Turbulence and vortex dynamics in two dimensions
- Doctoral advisor: Eric Dean Siggia
- Doctoral students: Gretar Tryggvason

Hassan Aref (Arabic: حسن عارف), (28 September 1950 – 9 September 2011) was the Reynolds Metals Professor in the Department of Engineering Science and Mechanics at Virginia Tech, and the Niels Bohr Visiting Professor at the Technical University of Denmark. Hassan Aref was an Egyptian immigrant to the US.

== Education ==
He was educated at the University of Copenhagen Niels Bohr Institute, graduating in 1975 with a cand. scient degree in Physics and Mathematics. Subsequently he received a PhD degree in Physics from Cornell University in 1980.

== Career ==
=== Academia and research ===
Prior to joining Virginia Tech as Dean of Engineering in 2003-2005 Aref was Head of the Department of Theoretical and Applied Mechanics at University of Illinois at Urbana-Champaign for a decade from 1992-2003. Before that he was on the faculty of University of California, San Diego, split between the Department of Applied Mechanics and Engineering Science and the Institute of Geophysics and Planetary Physics 1985-1992. Simultaneously, he was Chief Scientist at the San Diego Supercomputer Center for three years 1989-1992. Aref started his faculty career in the Division of Engineering at Brown University 1980-85.

=== Editorial work ===
Throughout his career Aref was involved in editorial work. He was Associate Editor of Journal of Fluid Mechanics 1984-94, founding editor with David Crighton of Cambridge Texts in Applied Mathematics, and served on the editorial board of Theoretical and Computational Fluid Dynamics and as co-editor of Advances in Applied Mechanics. He served on the editorial boards of Physics of Fluids, Physical Review E, and Regular and Chaotic Dynamics.

== Notable research ==
=== Fluid mechanics ===
Aref was the author of some 80 articles in leading journals in the field of fluid mechanics. He has also authored chapters in several books, edited two collections of papers, and given presentations at conferences and universities around the world. Aref received the 2000 Otto Laporte Award from the American Physical Society for this work and for his work on vortex dynamics for which he is also well known.

== Positions on scientific committees ==
Aref served as chair of the Division of Fluid Dynamics of the American Physical Society. He chaired the US National Committee on Theoretical and Applied Mechanics and has served on advisory boards for several professional societies. He was a member of the Executive Committee of the Congress Committee of the International Union of Theoretical and Applied Mechanics (IUTAM), a member of the National Academies Board on International Scientific Organizations, and a member of the Board of the Society of Engineering Science. He served as Secretary for the Midwest Mechanics Seminar, 1994-2003.

Aref was president of the 20th International Congress of Theoretical and Applied Mechanics held in Chicago in 2000. In the 70+ years of these significant congresses they have been held three times in USA: In 1938 in Boston, MA, with MIT and Harvard University as the host institutions, in 1968 with Stanford University as the host, and in 2000 with a consortium led by University of Illinois, Urbana-Champaign as the hosts.

== Personal life and death ==
Hassan Aref was born in Alexandria, Egypt. Previously a citizen of Canada, he acquired U.S. citizenship in 1998. He died from an aortic dissection.

== Honors and awards ==
- 2011 Geoffrey Ingram Taylor Medal
- 2011 Honorary Doctorate, Technical University of Denmark
- 2006 Niels Bohr Visiting Professor, Technical University of Denmark
- 2003 Reynolds Metals Professor, Virginia Tech
- 2001 Fellow, World Innovation Foundation
- 2000 Otto Laporte Award, American Physical Society "For his pioneering contributions to the study of chaotic motion in fluids, scientific computation, and vortex dynamics, and most notably for the development of the concept of chaotic advection."
- 2000 Fellow, American Academy of Mechanics
- 1994 Toshiba Keio Lecture, Keio University, Japan
- 1991 Westinghouse Distinguished Lectureship, University of Michigan
- 1991 Lecturer, Midwest Mechanics Seminar
- 1988 Fellow, American Physical Society "For the elucidation of chaotic motion in few-vortex problems and particle advection, and for the development of numerical methods based on many-vortex interactions."
- 1988 Stanley Corrsin Lectureship, The Johns Hopkins University
- 1986 Foreign Member, Danish Centre for Applied Mathematics and Mechanics
- 1985 Presidential Young Investigator Award, National Science Foundation
- 1975 NATO Fellowship; Cornell University Graduate Fellowship, 1975–1980
