= John Hinch =

John Hinch may refer to:

- John Hinch (mathematician) (born 1947), British mathematician
- John Hinch (musician) (1947–2021), British drummer
