= Grae =

Grae may refer to:

== Given name ==
- Grae Fernandez (born 2001), Filipino actor
- Grae Kessinger (born 1997), American baseball player
- Grae Worster (born 1958), British physicist

== Surname ==
- Camarin Grae, the pen name of Marian Grace (born 1941), American writer
- Jean Grae (born 1976), American rapper

== See also ==
- GRAE, Revolutionary Government of Angola in Exile
- Græ, a 2020 album by Moses Sumney
