= Yih =

YIH or Yih may refer to:

- Western Yiddish language's ISO 639-3 language code
- Yichang Sanxia Airport's IATA code

== People with the name ==
- Mae Yih (born 1928), former member of both houses of the legislature of the U.S. state of Oregon
- Chia-Shun Yih (1918–1997), Professor Emeritus at the University of Michigan
