= David Ting =

Canadian academic, author and researcher

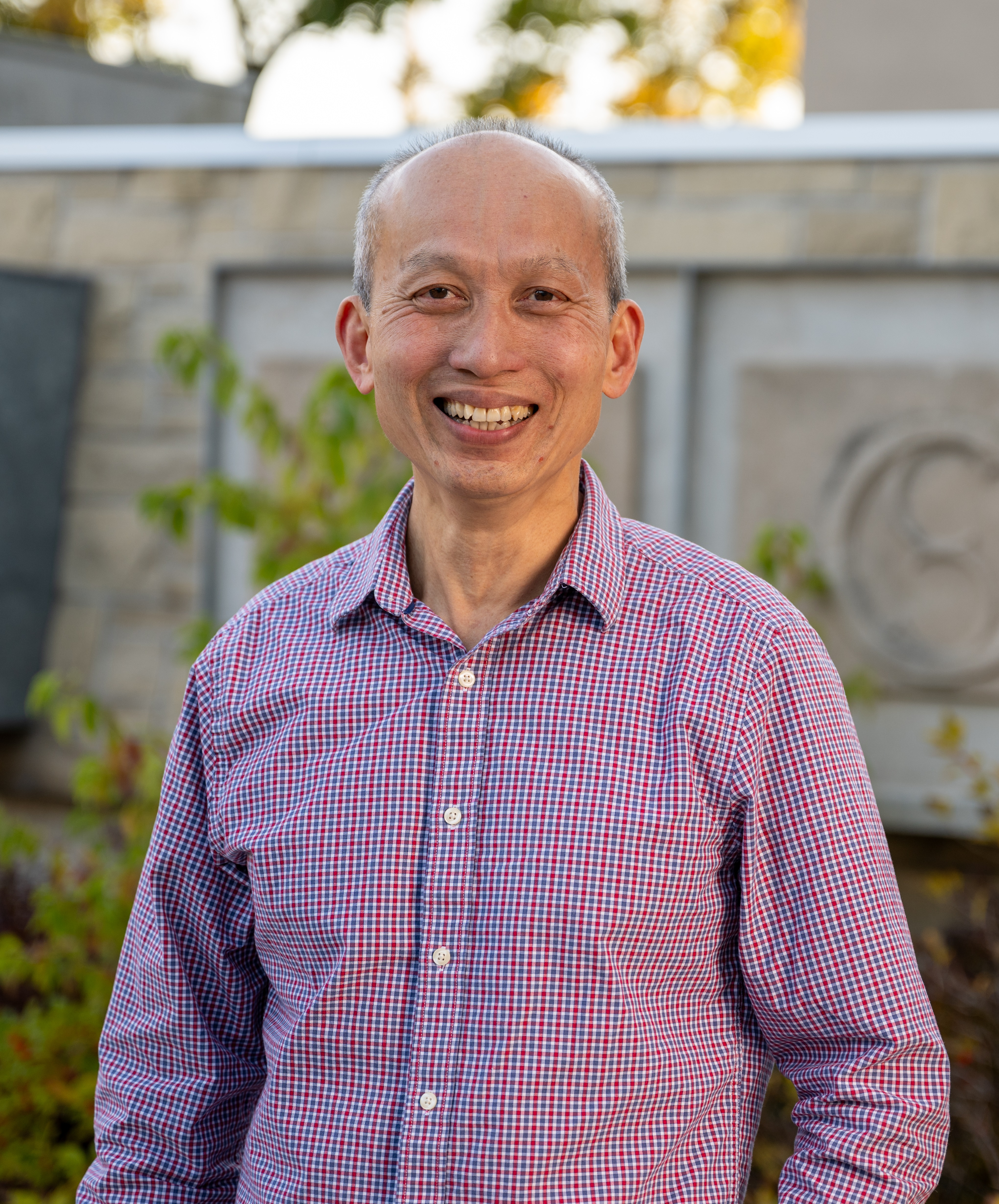
- Born: Malaysia
- Occupations: Academic, author and researcher

Academic background
- Education: Bachelor of Applied Science; Master of Applied Science; PhD in mechanical engineering
- Alma mater: University of Manitoba; University of Alberta
- Thesis: Modelling turbulent flame growth in a cubical chamber

David S-K Ting is a Canadian academic, author and researcher. He is a professor of mechanical, automotive & materials engineering at the University of Windsor. He is the founder of the Turbulence & Energy Laboratory.

Ting is the author of 7 books including Basics of Engineering Turbulence, Engineering Combustion Essentials, Lecture Notes on Engineering Human Thermal Comfort and Engineering Design and Optimization of Thermofluid Systems. He has co-authored over 140 research papers. His research focuses on Flow Turbulence along with Energy Conservation and Renewable Energy.

== Education ==
In 1985, Ting enrolled in University of Manitoba and completed his bachelor studies in 1989. He then completed his master's degree and doctoral studies from University of Alberta in 1992 and 1995 respectively. Ting completed his postdoctoral fellowship from McGill University in 1997.

== Career ==
Ting joined University of Windsor in 1997 as an assistant professor and became a tenured associate professor in 2001. In 2005, he was promoted to professor of mechanical, automotive & materials engineering.

== Research ==
Ting's research areas encompass combustion and turbulence, heat transfer and energy production, among others.

=== Combustion and turbulence ===
His early research focused on the association between combustion and turbulence. In the 1990s, he conducted experiments to investigate the importance of turbulence intensity, eddy size and flame size in premixed flame growth. The effect of each variable was experimentally scrutinized in a controlled environment and a formula was devised to explain the relation between the laminar burning velocity, flame radius and the turbulence intensity. In similar research about turbulent flames and flame area enhancement, his mentors and he used a structural model of turbulence to explain the turbulent flame acceleration. In order to study the turbulence effects on burning velocities, Ting used high speed Schlieren video and pressure trace analyses to study the turbulent flame propagation of propane and methane air mixtures. They found that the small-scale turbulence is more effective in enhancing the burning velocity of a growing flame than larger-scale turbulence when intensity is kept constant. The experiment also indicated that larger flames have a greater turbulence effect and surface-to-volume ratio.

=== Wind turbines and power production ===
Ting also focused his research work on the application of wind turbines in energy generation. Along with his graduate students and colleague, they used Adaptive Neuro-Fuzzy Inference System and imputation techniques to determine the wind turbine power production. They substituted missing values with decision tree concept which resulted in a greater accuracy in the data and inferences. Similarly, they employed a fusion of feature extraction, imputation, MLP and ANFIS network for predicting power production. They suggest a new algorithm and methods for reducing missing values h. In 2019, they wrote an article on the impact of wind turbulence on solar energy harvesting and conversion into high quality electricity. By comparing various turbulence inducing devices, they found the heat transfer coefficient to be significantly influenced by the turbulence intensity.

=== Convection heat transfer ===
Their research about the power production led to his research in convection heat transfer. They studied the impact of a rectangular strip of measured proportions on a flat plate heat convection. The results of the heat transfer indicate a better heat removal. Similarly, they investigated the impact of free stream turbulence on the rate of forced convective heat transfer. They tested the free stream turbulence using perforated tubes in their experiment. The results showed that the increase in turbulence intensity leads to increase in heat transfer in the case of fixed turbulent length scale.

== Awards and honors ==
- 2008 - ASHRAE Chapter Service Award
- 2014 - SAGE Best Paper Prize
- 2018 - ASME Heat Transfer Division, Best Reviewer of the Year

== Publications ==
=== Selected books ===
- Basics of Engineering Turbulence (2016)
- Lecture Notes on Engineering Human Thermal Comfort (2020)
- Engineering Design and Optimization of Thermofluid Systems (2021)
- Thermofluids: From Nature to Engineering (2022)

=== Selected articles ===
- D.S-K. Ting, M.D. Checkel, “The importance of turbulence intensity, eddy size and flame size in spark ignited, premixed flame growth,” Journal of Automobile Engineering, 211: 83–86, 1997.
- D.S-K. Ting, D.J. Wang, S.J. Price, M.P. Paidoussis, “An experimental study on the fluid elastic forces for two staggered circular cylinders in cross-flow,” Journal of Fluids and Structures, 12: 259–294, 1998.
- R. Liu, D.S-K. Ting, “Turbulent flow downstream of a perforated plate: sharp-edged orifice versus finite-thickness holes,” Journal of Fluids Engineering, 129: 1164–1171, 2007.
- A. Raeesi, S. Cheng, D.S-K. Ting, “Aerodynamic damping of an inclined circular cylinder in unsteady flow and its application to the prediction of dry inclined cable galloping,” Journal of Wind Engineering and Industrial Aerodynamics, 113: 12–28, 2013.
- A.R. Vasel-Be-Hagh, R. Carriveau, D.S-K. Ting, “A balloon bursting underwater,” Journal of Fluid Mechanics, 769: 522–540, 2015.
- J. Aman, P. Henshaw, D.S-K. Ting, “Performance characterization of a bubble pump for vapor absorption refrigeration systems,” International Journal of Refrigeration, 85: 58–69, 2018.
- Y. Yang, D. S-K. Ting, S. Ray, “Augmentation of flat surface forced convection by a pair of rectangular strips – a wavelet analysis,” International Journal of Heat and Mass Transfer, 185: 122414, 2022.
