= Morteza Gharib =

- Born: December 9, 1952 (age 73)
- Education: Tehran University (BSc); Syracuse University (MSc); Caltech (PhD)
- Known for: Flow control Vortex dynamics Biomechanics; Fluid Mechanics
- Awards: Fluid Dynamics Prize (APS) (2015)
- Scientific career
- Fields: Mechanical engineering Medical engineering
- Institutions: Caltech
- Doctoral advisor: Anatol Roshko

Morteza "Mory" Gharib (Persian: مرتضی قریب; born December 9, 1952) is an Iranian-American engineer and fluid dynamicist. He is the Hans W. Liepmann Professor of Aeronautics and Bio-Inspired Engineering at the California Institute of Technology.

Gharib was elected a member of the National Academy of Engineering in 2015 for contributions to fluid flow diagnostics and imagery, and engineering of bioinspired devices and phenomena.

== Early life and education ==
Gharib was born in Tehran in 1952. His father, originally from Garakan, held a bachelor's degree in communications engineering and worked in telegraph and telephone systems before establishing a private school to teach mathematics and English. His mother migrated from Azerbaijan following the Bolshevik Revolution and was a high school teacher in French. His parents were secular Muslims who emphasized education. As a child, Gharib redesigned the water circulation system of their family garden. As a teenager, he built small rockets and developed an interest in aeronautics.

He earned his Bachelor of Science degree in mechanical engineering from the University of Tehran in 1976. He moved to the United States, obtaining a Master of Science in mechanical and aerospace engineering from Syracuse University in 1978, with a focus on fluid mechanics. He completed a doctorate in aeronautics at the Guggenheim Aeronautical Laboratory at Caltech in 1983. His dissertation, supervised by Anatol Roshko, centered on vortex dynamics in low-turbulence water tunnels using laser velocimetry techniques.

== Research ==
Gharib's research interests cover a range of topics in conventional fluid dynamics and aeronautics. These include vortex dynamics, active and passive flow control, nano/micro fluid dynamics, bio-inspired wind and hydro energy harvesting, as well as advanced flow imaging diagnostics.

He is heavily involved in scientific research on biomechanics and medical engineering. He primarily researches the fluid dynamics of physiological machines, such as the human circulatory system and the breathing and propulsion of aquatic organisms, and the development of medical devices such as heart valves, cardiovascular health monitoring devices, and drug delivery systems.

== Awards and honors ==
Gharib is the recipient of the 2016 G. I. Taylor Medal from the Society of Engineering Science and he received the American Physical Society's Fluid Dynamics award in 2015. He's a Member of the American Academy of Arts and Sciences and the National Academy of Engineering; and he's a Fellow (Charter) of the National Academy of Inventors, the American Association for the Advancement of Science, the American Physical Society, the American Society of Mechanical Engineering and the International Academy of Medical and Biological Engineering.
