= Raymond E. Goldstein =

Professor of Complex Physical Systems

Ray Goldstein
- Born: Raymond Ethan Goldstein; 1 December 1961 (age 64); West Orange, New Jersey
- Education: Massachusetts Institute of Technology (BS); Cornell University (MS, PhD)
- Awards: FRS (2013); FInstP (2009); FIMA (2010); Ig Nobel Prize (2012)
- Scientific career
- Fields: Biophysics; Complex systems; Nonlinear systems
- Workplaces: University of Cambridge; University of Chicago; Princeton University; University of Arizona
- Thesis: Studies of phase transitions and critical phenomena: I. Origin of broken particle-hole symmetry in critical fluids. II. Phase transitions of interacting membranes (1988)
- Doctoral advisor: Neil Ashcroft
- Website: damtp.cam.ac.uk/user/gold; www.damtp.cam.ac.uk/people/r.e.goldstein

Raymond Ethan Goldstein (born 1961) FRS FInstP is the Alan Turing Professor of Complex Physical Systems in the Department of Applied Mathematics and Theoretical Physics (DAMTP) at the University of Cambridge and a Fellow of Churchill College, Cambridge.

== Education ==
Goldstein was educated at the West Orange Public Schools and Massachusetts Institute of Technology (MIT) where he graduated Phi Beta Kappa with double major Bachelor of Science degrees in Physics and Chemistry in 1983. He continued his education at Cornell University where he was awarded a Master of Science degree in physics in 1986, followed by a PhD in 1988 for research on phase transitions and critical phenomena supervised by Neil Ashcroft.

== Research ==
Goldstein's research focuses on understanding nonequilibrium phenomena in the natural world, with particular emphasis on biophysics and has been funded by the Engineering and Physical Sciences Research Council (EPSRC), the Biotechnology and Biological Sciences Research Council (BBSRC) and the European Union 7th Framework Programme on Research & Innovation (FP7). His research has been published in leading peer reviewed scientific journals including Proceedings of the National Academy of Sciences of the United States of America, Physical Review Letters, and the Journal of Fluid Mechanics.

== Career ==
Goldstein has held academic appointments at the University of Chicago, Princeton University and the University of Arizona. He was appointed Schlumberger Professor (subsequently renamed the Alan Turing Professor) at the University of Cambridge in 2006.

== Awards and honours ==
Goldstein was awarded the Stefanos Pnevmatikos International Award in 2000. He was elected Fellow of the American Physical Society in 2002, Fellow of the Institute of Physics (FInstP) in 2009 and the Institute of Mathematics and its Applications (FIMA) in 2010. With Joseph Keller, Patrick B. Warren and Robin C. Ball, Goldstein was awarded an Ig Nobel Prize in 2012 for calculating the forces that shape and move ponytail hair.

Goldstein was elected a Fellow of the Royal Society (FRS) in 2013. His nomination reads:

Raymond Goldstein is an internationally recognised leader in the fields of biological physics and nonlinear dynamics. He is distinguished for having made important mathematical contributions to those subjects as well as pioneering experimental discoveries. His broad-ranging contributions include classic work on the dynamics of pattern formation driven by long-range forces, the differential geometry of interfacial pattern formation, and the explanation for the shapes of stalactites. He has made seminal experimental contributions to the study of active matter, including developing a class of green algae as model organisms for the study of biological fluid dynamics, the physics of multicellularity, and the synchronisation of eukaryotic flagella.

He was awarded the 2016 Batchelor Prize of the International Union of Theoretical and Applied Mechanics for his research into active matter fluid mechanics., and the Institute of Physics Rosalind Franklin Medal and Prize for revealing the physical basis for fluid motion in and around active cells.

== Personal life ==
Goldstein married Argentine mathematical physicist Adriana Pesci.
