= Stephen H. Davis =

American mathematician (1939–2021)

- Born: September 7, 1939
- Died: November 12, 2021 (aged 82)
- Awards: Member, Academia Europaea (2017); Royal Society of Engineering (U.K.) Distinguished Researcher Award (2014); Commemorative Volume (647), Journal of Fluid Mechanics (2010); Member, Johns Hopkins Society of Scholars (2010); Member, National Academy of Sciences (2004); D.Sc. (honoris causa), University of Western Ontario (2001); G. I. Taylor Medal, Society of Engineering Sciences (2001); Member, American Academy of Arts and Sciences (1995); Fluid Dynamics Prize, American Physical Society (1994); Humboldt Prize for Senior Research Scientists (1994); Member, National Academy of Engineering (1994)
- Scientific career
- Fields: Applied mathematics Fluid dynamics Materials science
- Workplaces: Imperial College London (1966-1968) Johns Hopkins University (1968-1978) Northwestern University (1979-2021)
- Thesis: Effects of free boundaries and property variations in thermal convection. (1964)
- Doctoral advisor: Lee Segel

Stephen Howard Davis (September 7, 1939 – November 12, 2021) was an American applied mathematician working in the fields of fluid mechanics and materials science. Davis served as McCormick School Institute Professor and Walter P. Murphy Professor of Applied Mathematics at Northwestern University. He has been listed as an ISI Highly Cited Researcher in the field of engineering. His work was acknowledged in festschrifts in 2002.

Davis was elected a member of the National Academy of Engineering in 1994 for contributions to the mathematics of hydrodynamic stability theory and interfacial phenomena. An ISI Highly Cited Researcher, Davis has authored four books and more than 200 academic publications, and given numerous special lectures.

== Career ==
Davis received his B.E.E. in Electrical Engineering from the Rensselaer Polytechnic Institute in 1960 and the M.S. and PhD in Mathematics in 1962 and 1964, respectively. He was a research mathematician at the RAND Corporation from 1964 to 1966, a lecturer in Applied Mathematics at Imperial College London for 1966–1968, and assistant, associate, and full professor of Mechanics at the Johns Hopkins University from 1968–1978.

Davis joined the Northwestern faculty in January 1979. When he retired in 2019, Davis also held courtesy appointments in the mechanical engineering and chemical and biological engineering departments in Northwestern University. He was assistant then associate editor of the Journal of Fluid Mechanics from 1969–1989 and the editor from 2000–2009. He was an editor of the Annual Review of Fluid Mechanics from 2001–2021.

== Research ==
Davis' research interests included theoretical fluid mechanics, hydrodynamic stability and interfacial phenomena, materials science, thin films and crystal growth, and asymptotic and variational methods.

Davis is known for introducing new mathematical methods in fluid mechanics and material science, confronting issues beyond the frontiers of the fields, and obtaining fundamental understandings of mechanisms of behavior in anticipation of future needs.

In fluid mechanics, Davis first studied the instability of time-dependent flows including Stokes Layers and first identified and studied dynamic instabilities driven by variations in surface tension along interfaces. He gave the first nonlinear theory of film rupture by instabilities driven by van der Waals attractions and the first coupling of evaporation and thin film instabilities. He gave the first analytic theory of moving contact lines leading to the understanding of the dynamics and instabilities of droplet spreading. His highly-cited review article laid out how long-wave asymptotic theory would be the basis of research worldwide in the analysis of thin-films, droplet spreading, and micro/nano-science flows.

In material science, Davis pioneered the coupling of morphological instabilities and material anisotropy and was the first to give results for rapid solidification in which thermodynamic disequilibrium generates banding. He wrote the book Theory of Solidification for Cambridge University Press. Further, he was the first to use long-wave theories to describe the destabilization of deposited solid films and their evolution to quantum dots through coarsening via the derivation of convective Cahn-Hilliard equations. He gave growth laws for nanowire evolution by bulk or surface diffusion (stepwise growth). Davis studied the dynamics of metallic foams and devised a unique numerical simulation based on a network model that can be used to follow in time a regular foam as it becomes disorganized.

Finally, Davis pioneered the study of the interaction of fluid and solidification finding ways of using imposed motion to delay morphological instability and showing how freezing can modify the modes of convection. He outlined a method of freezing a metallic foam so as to produce a porous solid with uniform permeability.

== Honors and awards ==
- 2017, Member, Academia Europaea
- 2004, Member, National Academy of Sciences
- 2001, G. I. Taylor Medal, Society of Engineering Science (SES)
- 1995, Fellow, American Academy of Arts and Sciences
- 1994, Member, National Academy of Engineering
- 1994, Fluid Dynamics Prize, American Physical Society
- 1994, Humboldt Research Award for Senior Research Scientists, Alexander von Humboldt Foundation
