= Otto Laporte Award =

The Otto Laporte Award (1972–2003) was an annual award by the American Physical Society (APS) to "recognize outstanding contributions to fluid dynamics" and to honour Otto Laporte (1902–1971). It was established as the Otto Laporte Memorial Lectureship by the APS Division of Fluid Dynamics in 1972, and became an APS award in 1985. The Otto Laporte Award was merged into the Fluid Dynamics Prize in 2004, in order to obtain one major prize in fluid dynamics by the APS.

== Recipients ==
- 2003: Norman J. Zabusky
- 2002: Andrea Prosperetti
- 2001: John Kim
- 2000: Hassan Aref
- 1999: Eli Reshotko
- 1998: David G. Crighton
- 1997: Marvin Emanuel Goldstein
- 1996: Donald Coles
- 1995: Katepalli R. Sreenivasan
- 1994: Philip G. Saffman
- 1993: Robert Kraichnan
- 1992: William C. Reynolds
- 1991: Steven A. Orszag
- 1990: Tony Maxworthy
- 1989: Chia-Shun Yih
- 1988: Akiva Yaglom
- 1987: John Trevor Stuart
- 1986: Milton Van Dyke
- 1985: Hans W. Liepmann
- 1984: Sir James Lighthill
- 1983: John W. Miles
- 1982: Peter Wegener
- 1981: H. W. Emmons
- 1980: R. Byron Bird
- 1979: Stanley Corrsin
- 1978: Cecil E. Leith, Jr.
- 1977: Y. C. Fung
- 1976: George F. Carrier
- 1975: Russell J. Donnelly
- 1974: J. M. Burgers
- 1973: Chia C. Lin
- 1972: Richard G. Fowler

== See also ==
- List of physics awards
