= Tryggvason =

Tryggvason may refer to:

- Olaf Tryggvason (died 1000)
- Bjarni Tryggvason (born 1945), Icelandic-born Canadian engineer and a former NRC/CSA astronaut
- Gretar Tryggvason (born 1956), Professor and Head of the Mechanical Engineering Department at the Worcester Polytechnic Institute

== See also ==
- 14988 Tryggvason (1997 UA7), a Main-belt Asteroid discovered in 1997
- HNoMS Olav Tryggvason, built for the Royal Norwegian Navy by the naval shipyard at Horten in the early 1930s
