= Charles Meneveau =

French-Chilean born American fluid dynamicist

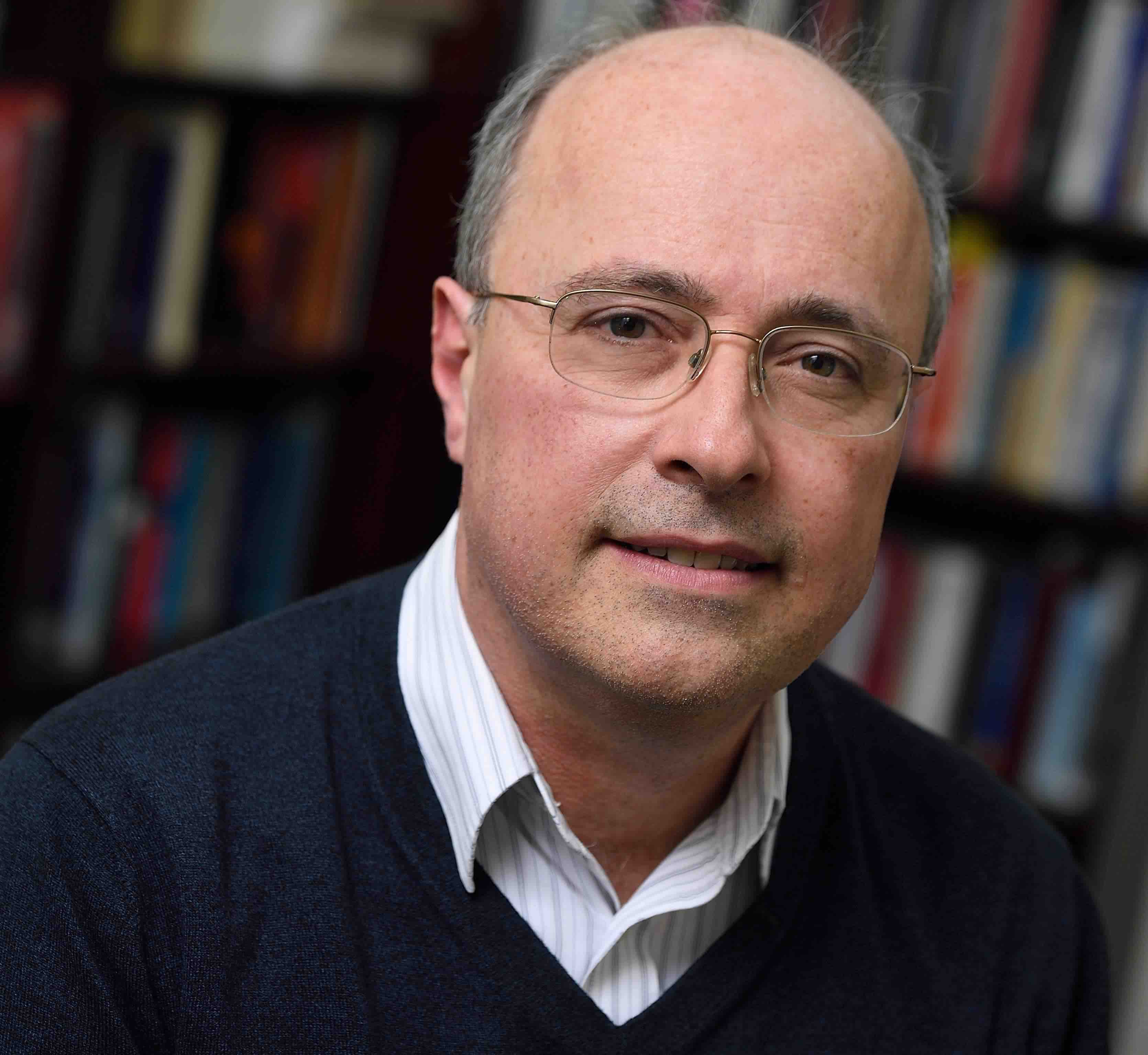
- Charles Meneveau in 2018
- Born: 1960 (age 65–66); Paris, France
- Title: L.M. Sardella Professor

Academic background
- Education: Yale University; Universidad Técnica Federico Santa María
- Thesis: "The multifractal nature of turbulence" (1989)
- Doctoral advisor: K. R. Sreenivasan
- Other advisor: B. Mandelbrot
- Website: pages.jh.edu/~cmeneve1/

Charles Meneveau (born 1960) is a French-Chilean born American fluid dynamicist, known for his work on turbulence, including turbulence modeling and computational fluid dynamics.

Charles Meneveau, the Louis M. Sardella Professor in Mechanical Engineering and an associate director of the Institute for Data Intensive Engineering and Science (IDIES) at Johns Hopkins University, focuses his research on understanding and modeling hydrodynamic turbulence, and on complexity in fluid mechanics in general. He combines computational, theoretical and experimental tools for his research, with an emphasis on the multiscale aspects of turbulence, using tools such as subgrid-scale modeling, downscaling techniques, and fractal geometry, and applications to Large Eddy Simulation (LES). He pioneered the use of the Lagrangian dynamic procedure for sub-grid scale modeling in large-eddy simulation (LES) of turbulence. His recent work includes the use of LES for wind-energy-related applications and the development of the Johns Hopkins Turbulence Database for sharing large-scale datasets from high-fidelity computational fluid dynamics calculations.

== Education ==
1989: Ph.D. in mechanical engineering, Yale University, May 1989

1988: Master of Philosophy, Yale University, 1988

1987: Master of Science, Yale University, 1987

1985: B.S. in mechanical engineering, Universidad Técnica Federico Santa María, Valparaíso (Chile), 1985

His Ph.D. advisor was K. R. Sreenivasan and his thesis was on the multi-fractal nature of small-scale turbulence. At Yale he was also informally co-advised by B. B. Mandelbrot.

== Career and research ==
Meneveau's postdoctoral position was at the Stanford University/NASA-Ames's Center. He has been on the faculty of the Johns Hopkins University since 1990. His main appointment is in the Department of Mechanical Engineering with secondary appointments in the Departments of Environmental Health and Engineering and Physics and Astronomy.

Professor Meneveau's research is focused on understanding and modeling hydrodynamic turbulence, and complexity in fluid mechanics in general. Special emphasis is placed on the multiscale aspects of turbulence, using tools such as subgrid-scale modeling, downscaling techniques, and fractal geometry. Applications of the results to Large Eddy Simulation (LES) have facilitated applications of LES to engineering, environmental and geophysical flow phenomena. Currently, Meneveau is focused on applications of LES to wind energy and wind farm fluid dynamics, on developing advanced wall models for LES, on modelling oil dispersion in the ocean, as well as on building "big-data" tools to share the very large data sets that arise in computational fluid dynamics in collaboration with other scientists and engineers.

Among Meneveau's main contributions are advances to turbulence modelling and large eddy simulations. The advances were made possible by elucidating the properties of the small-scale motions in turbulent flows and applying the new insights to the development of advanced subgrid-scale models, such as the Lagrangian dynamic model. This model has been implemented in various research and open source CFD codes (e.g. OpenFoam) and expanded the applicability of Large Eddy Simulations to complex-geometry flows of engineering and environmental interest, where prior models could not be used.

Among the application areas of Large Eddy Simulation being pursued in Meneveau's group is the study of complex flows in large wind farms. Using the improved simulation tools as well as wind tunnel tests, Meneveau and his colleagues identified the important process of vertical entrainment of mean flow kinetic energy into an array of wind turbines. This research has clarified the mechanisms limiting wind plant performance at a time when there is enormous growth in wind farms. The research has led to new engineering models that will allow for better-designed wind farms thus increasing their economic benefit and helping to reduce greenhouse gas emissions from fossil fuels.

Meneveau has participated in efforts to democratize access to valuable "big data" in turbulence. As a deputy director of JHU's Institute for Data Intensive Engineering and Science, he worked with a team of computer scientists, applied mathematicians, astrophysicists, and fluid dynamicists that built the JHTDB (Johns Hopkins Turbulence Databases). This open numerical laboratory provides researchers from around the world with user-friendly access to large data sets arising from Direct Numerical Simulations of various types of turbulent flows. To date, hundreds of researchers worldwide have used the data, and flow data at over hundred trillion points have been sampled from the database. The system has demonstrated how "big data" resulting from large world-class numerical simulations can be shared with many researchers who lack the massive supercomputing resources needed to generate such data.

Meneveau also has performed groundbreaking research on understanding several multiscale aspects of turbulence. As part of his doctoral work at Yale in the late 1980s, Meneveau and his advisor Prof. K. R. Sreenivasan established the fractal and multifractal theory for turbulent flows and confirmed the theory using experiments. Interfaces in turbulence were shown to have a fractal dimension of nearly 7/3, where the 1/3 exponent above the value of two valid for smooth surfaces could be related to the classic Kolmogorov theory. And a universal multi-fractal spectrum was established, leading to a simple cascade model, which has since been applied to many other physical, biological and socio-economic systems. Later, as a postdoc at Stanford University's Center for Turbulence Research under the guidance of Prof. P. Moin, Meneveau pioneered the application of orthogonal wavelet analysis to turbulence, introducing the concept of wavelet spectrum and other scale-dependent statistical measures of variability.

== Awards, honors, societies and journal editorships ==
=== Awards ===
2024: Awarded G K Batchelor Prize for his high-impact fundamental contributions to the study of turbulence and wall-bounded flows, and for bringing insightful and rigorous fluid mechanics to the science of wind turbines and wind farms for the benefit of society.

2021: Recipient, 2021 Fluid Dynamics Award from the American Institute of Aeronautics and Astronautics (AIAA), "for advancing both the theoretical and practical understanding of turbulence through groundbreaking modeling techniques and applications of large-eddy simulation."

2018: Elected Member, National Academy of Engineering (NAE), "for contributions to turbulence small-scale dynamics, large-eddy simulations, wind farm fluid dynamics, and leadership in the fluid dynamics community".

2016: Awarded honorary doctorate from the Danish Technical University, Doctor Tecnices, Honoris Causa for "Outstanding and highly innovative scientific achievements in fluid dynamics, particularly for his work on turbulence and atmospheric physics and its applications to wind energy".

2014-2015: Midwest Mechanics Lecturer

2012-2013: Fulbright Scholar, US-Australia Fulbright Scholarship

2012: Stanley Corrsin Lecturer, Johns Hopkins University

2011: First recipient of the Stanley Corrsin Award from the American Physical Society, citation: "For his innovative use of experimental data and turbulence theory in the development of advanced models for large-eddy simulations, and for the application of these models to environmental, geophysical and engineering applications."

2005: Foreign corresponding member of the Chilean Academy of Sciences

2005: Appointed to the Louis M. Sardella Professorship in Mechanical Engineering

2004: UCAR Outstanding Publication Award for co-authorship of the paper by Horst et al., that appeared in J. Atmospheric Science

2003: Johns Hopkins University Alumni Association Excellence in Teaching Award

2001: François N. Frenkiel Award for Fluid Mechanics, American Physical Society

1989: Henry P. Becton Prize for Excellence in Research, Yale University

1985: Premio Federico Santa María, UTFSM Valparaíso, Chile

=== Societies ===
American Academy of Mechanics, Fellow.

American Society of Mechanical Engineers, Fellow.

American Physical Society, Fellow.

Pi Tau Sigma, Honorary Member

American Geophysical Union, Member.

American Institute for Aeronautics and Astronautics, Senior Member.

=== Editorships ===
2010–Present: Deputy editor, Journal of Fluid Mechanics

2019: Chair, American Physical Society, Division of Fluid Dynamics

2008–Present: Key participant in the development and maintenance of the JHTDB (Johns Hopkins Turbulence Databases) open numerical laboratory

2003-2015: Editor-in-chief, Journal of Turbulence

2005-2010: Associate editor, Journal of Fluid Mechanics

2005-2010: Member, editorial committee, Annual Rev. of Fluid Mechanics

2001–Present: Member, advisory board, Theor. & Comp. Fluid Dynamics

2001-2003: Associate editor, Physics of Fluids

2003: Guest associate editor, Annual Reviews of Fluid Mechanics

== Journal publications ==
Google Scholar page
