= Alexander Smits =

Australian-American engineer and academic

Alexander J. Smits AO
- Born: 25 December 1948 (age 77); Amsterdam, Netherlands
- Education: University of Melbourne (PhD, 1975)
- Awards: Fluid Dynamics Prize (2019)
- Scientific career
- Fields: Fluid mechanics
- Workplaces: Princeton University
- Thesis: Further Developments of Hot Wire and Laser Methods in Fluid Mechanics (1974)
- Doctoral students: Beverley McKeon

Alexander John Smits AO (born 25 December 1948) is an Australian-American engineer and academic who is the Eugene Higgins Professor of Mechanical and Aerospace Engineering, Emeritus, at Princeton University. He is also the director of the Gas dynamics laboratory at Princeton. Smits received his Bachelor of Science in mechanical engineering from the University of Melbourne, Australia in 1970. Subsequently he received his Ph.D. from Melbourne in 1975.

Smits is an expert in the areas of turbulence and fluid mechanics, and is also the chief editor of Efluids.com, a website designed for students and researchers to share information about fluids. He is also currently an associate editor for the Journal of Fluid Mechanics and the Journal of Turbulence. Smits is the head of the Mechanical and Aerospace Engineering Department at Princeton University.

Smits was elected a member of the National Academy of Engineering in 2011 for contributions to the measurement and understanding of turbulent flows, fluids engineering, and education. Also, he became a member of the American Academy of Arts and Sciences in 2020. He was awarded the Batchelor Prize in 2020 for his significant research contributions to fluid mechanics over the previous decade.

Smits was appointed Officer of the Order of Australia (AO) in the 2023 Australia Day Honours for "distinguished service to aerospace engineering, particularly in the field of fluid dynamics, and to tertiary education".

== References in popular culture ==
Smits was referenced in an episode of Numbers, in which it was stated (with regard to fluid dynamics) that "there is some amazing work done by Prandtl, Euler, and Smits."

== Bibliography ==
- Alexander Smits, Eugene Higgins Professor of Mechanical and Aerospace Engineering, Chair
