= Geneviève Comte-Bellot =

French physicist (born 1929)

- Born: 29 July 1929 (age 96)
- Awards: Commander of the Legion of Honour (2013); Fluid Dynamics Prize (APS) (2014)
- Scientific career
- Fields: Fluid dynamics
- Institutions: École centrale de Lyon

Geneviève Comte-Bellot (born 29 July 1929) is a French physicist specialising in fluid dynamics. She is known for her work on turbulence and aeroacoustics.

== Biography ==
Comte-Bellot was born on 29 July 1929. After obtaining her diploma from the Université Grenoble Alpes in 1953, she earned her master's degree at the École normale supérieure in Paris the following year. She taught at a high school in Chalon-sur-Saône from 1954 to 1956, before joining the French National Center for Scientific Research as a Senior Research Associate; Comte-Bellot remained in this position until 1967. In 1963, Comte-Bellot completed her dissertation "Turbulent Flow between two parallel walls", and was awarded a PhD by the Université Grenoble Alpes. She became a postdoctoral researcher and joined Stanley Corrsin's team at Johns Hopkins University as a Fulbright scholar in 1963, where she oversaw his "Velvet wind-tunnel".

Comte-Bellot joined the École centrale de Lyon (ECL) in 1967 as a Maître de Conférences (lecturer) and became a professor in 1971, before her promotion to Professeur de Classe exceptionnelle in 1982. At this university, she began researching aeroacoustics and founded the acoustics department in 1980. She served as director of the training and research unit (UER) of mechanics at Claude Bernard University Lyon 1 from 1977 to 1982. On 2 April 1990, Comte-Bellot was appointed as a corresponding member of the French Academy of Sciences. Following her retirement, she became emeritus professor at the ECL in 1998.

In 2005, Comte-Bellot was appointed as a Foreign Associate of the National Academy of Engineering for contributions in fluid mechanics and acoustics. She is also a member of the French Academy of Technologies.

She was appointed Commander of the Legion of Honour in 2013. The American Physical Society awarded her with their Fluid Dynamics Prize in 2014.
