= John F. Brady (chemical engineer) =

American chemical engineer and professor

John Francis Brady
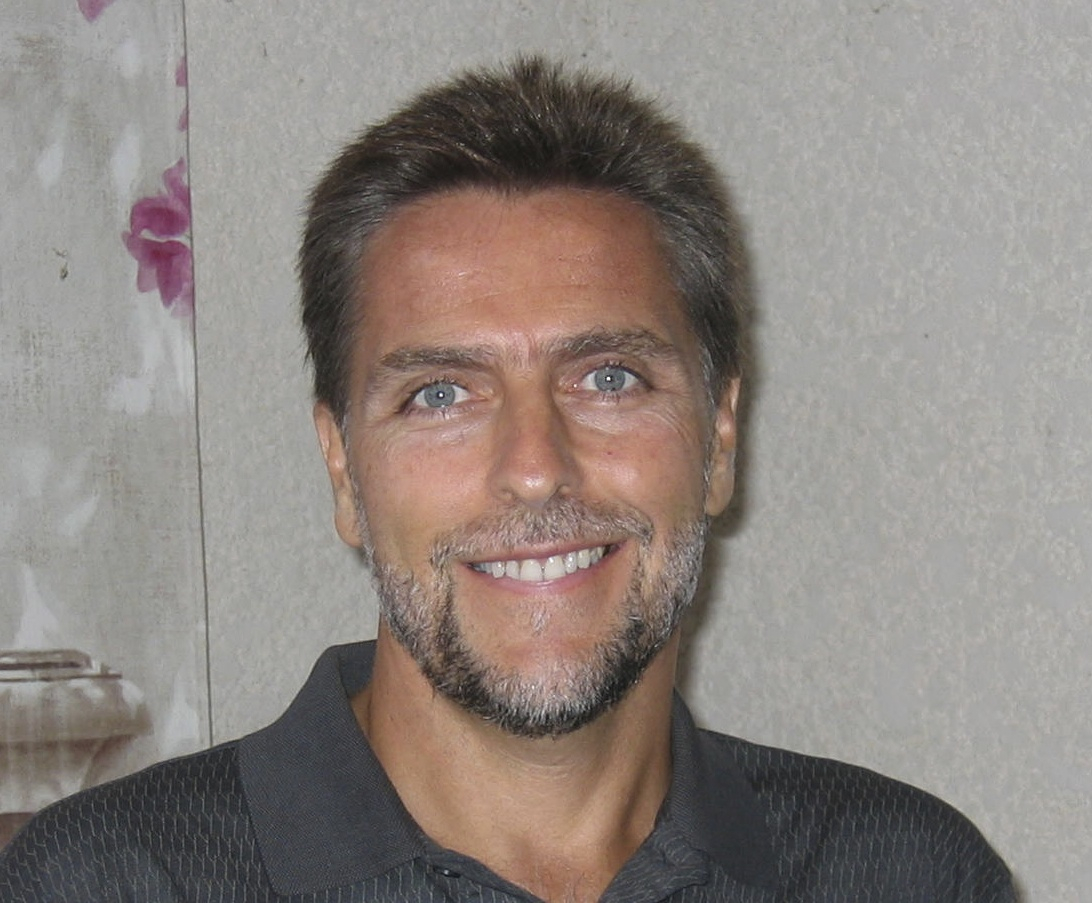
- Brady in 2015
- Born: 8 January 1954 (age 72); Dunkirk, New York, US
- Education: University of Pennsylvania; University of Cambridge; Stanford University
- Awards: National Academy of Sciences (2020) Society of Rheology (2015); American Academy of Arts and Sciences (2014); Fluid Dynamics Prize (APS) (2011); Bingham Medal (Society of Rheology (2007)); National Academy of Engineering (1999) American Physical Society (1994)
- Scientific career
- Fields: Fluid dynamics Rheology
- Workplaces: Massachusetts Institute of Technology; California Institute of Technology
- Thesis: Inertial effects in closed cavity flows and their influence in drop breakup (1981)
- Doctoral advisor: Andreas Acrivos

John Francis Brady (born January 8, 1954) is an American chemical engineer and the Chevron Professor of Chemical Engineering and Mechanical Engineering at the California Institute of Technology. He is a fluid mechanician and creator of the Stokesian dynamics method for simulating suspensions of spheres and ellipsoids in low Reynolds number flows. He is an elected fellow of the American Physical Society, a fellow of the Society of Rheology, as well as a member of the National Academy of Sciences, the National Academy of Engineering, and the American Academy of Arts and Sciences.

== Education and career ==
Brady was educated in chemical engineering at the University of Pennsylvania (B.S. 1975), the University of Cambridge, England (Certificate of Postgraduate Study, 1976), and Stanford University (M.S. 1977 and Ph.D. 1981). He completed his dissertation entitled Inertial effects in closed cavity flows and their influence in drop breakup advised by Professor Andreas Acrivos. Following his Ph.D., Brady was a NATO post-doctoral fellow at the Ecole Superiéure de Physique et de Chimie Industrielles, Paris, France (1980–81).

Following his research in France, Brady joined the faculty in chemical engineering at the Massachusetts Institute of Technology as an assistant professor in 1981. He moved in 1985 to the Division of Chemistry and Chemical Engineering at the California Institute of Technology, which has been his academic home since.

In 1999, Brady was elected a member of the National Academy of Engineering for his work in elucidating the basic mechanics of and developing methods for the simulation of multiphase flows.

== Research contributions ==
Brady is an expert in the theory and simulations of fluid mechanics, rheology, and transport phenomena. He has made significant research contributions in the understanding of active matter and suspensions. Among his many accomplishments is the creation of Stokesian dynamics with Georges Bossis. The Stokesian dynamics method allows the accurate and rapid simulation of the dynamics and rheology of suspensions of spherical particles at low Reynolds number. The technique has been used by researchers world-wide to model suspensions and understand a variety of physical systems. Brady and collaborators discovered the micromechanical "swim pressure" that contributes to the unique self-assembly and phase separation in a broad class of active matter.

Brady was an associate editor of the Journal of Fluid Mechanics (1990-2004) and the editor of the Journal of Rheology (2005-2012). According to Google Scholar, his publications have received over 19,000 citations and his h-index is 68.

== Awards and honors ==
He has received numerous awards and honors which include:

- Election to the National Academy of Sciences (2020)
- Fellow of the Society of Rheology (2015)
- American Academy of Arts and Sciences (2014)
- Fluid Dynamics Prize (APS) (2011)
- Bingham Medal Society of Rheology (2007)
- Election to the National Academy of Engineering (1999)
- Professional Progress Award, AIChE (1998)
- Fellow of the American Physical Society (1994)
- ASEE Curtis W. McGraw Research Award (1993)
- Joliot-Curie Professor, ESPCI Paris, France (1988), (1996)
- Camille and Henry Dreyfus Teacher-Scholar Award (1986)
- Presidential Young Investigator Award, National Science Foundation (1985)

== Selected publications ==
- Brady, J F; Bossis, G (1988). "Stokesian Dynamics". Annual Review of Fluid Mechanics. 20 (1). Annual Reviews: 111–157. Bibcode:1988AnRFM..20..111B. doi:10.1146/annurev.fl.20.010188.000551. ISSN 0066-4189.
- Wagner, Norman J.; Brady, John F. (2009). "Shear thickening in colloidal dispersions". Physics Today. 62 (10). AIP Publishing: 27–32. Bibcode:2009PhT....62j..27W. doi:10.1063/1.3248476. ISSN 0031-9228.
- Jamali, Safa; Brady, John F. (25 September 2019). "Alternative Frictional Model for Discontinuous Shear Thickening of Dense Suspensions: Hydrodynamics". Physical Review Letters. 123 (13) 138002. American Physical Society (APS). Bibcode:2019PhRvL.123m8002J. doi:10.1103/physrevlett.123.138002. ISSN 0031-9007. PMID 31697551. S2CID 204206911.
- Omar, Ahmad K.; Wang, Zhen-Gang; Brady, John F. (16 January 2020). "Microscopic origins of the swim pressure and the anomalous surface tension of active matter". Physical Review E. 101 (1) 012604. arXiv:1912.11727. Bibcode:2020PhRvE.101a2604O. doi:10.1103/physreve.101.012604. ISSN 2470-0045. PMID 32069575. S2CID 209501001.
- Takatori, Sho C.; De Dier, Raf; Vermant, Jan; Brady, John F. (10 March 2016). "Acoustic trapping of active matter". Nature Communications. 7 (1) 10694. Springer Science and Business Media LLC. Bibcode:2016NatCo...710694T. doi:10.1038/ncomms10694. ISSN 2041-1723. PMC 4792924. PMID 26961816.
- Takatori, S. C.; Yan, W.; Brady, J. F. (11 July 2014). "Swim Pressure: Stress Generation in Active Matter" (PDF). Physical Review Letters. 113 (2) 028103. American Physical Society (APS). Bibcode:2014PhRvL.113b8103T. doi:10.1103/physrevlett.113.028103. ISSN 0031-9007. PMID 25062240.
