= Adriana Pesci =

Argentine mathematician and physicist

Adriana Irma Pesci is an Argentine applied mathematician and mathematical physicist at the University of Cambridge, specialising in fluid dynamics. Her research topics have included lattice models of polymer solutions,^{[A]} Hele-Shaw flow,^{[B]} flagellar motion of organisms in fluids,^{[C]} soap films on Möbius strips,^{[D]} and the Leidenfrost effect.^{[E]}

== Education and career ==
Pesci is originally from Argentina, and earned her Ph.D. in 1986 at the National University of La Plata in Argentina. She was a postdoctoral researcher at the University of Chicago, under the mentorship of Leo Kadanoff and Norman Lebovitz.

She joined the University of Arizona as a lecturer in physics in 1999, becoming a senior lecturer in 2003. In 2007 she moved to the University of Cambridge, where she is a senior research associate in the Department of Applied Mathematics and Theoretical Physics, a fellow of King's College, and a former Darley Fellow in Mathematics of Downing College.

== Personal life ==
Pesci married Raymond E. Goldstein, a frequent coauthor who was also a postdoctoral researcher in Chicago and moved with her to Arizona and Cambridge.

== Selected publications ==
A.	Madden, William G.; Pesci, Adriana I.; Freed, Karl F. (February 1990), "Phase equilibria of lattice polymer and solvent: tests of theories against simulations", Macromolecules, 23 (4): 1181–1191, Bibcode:1990MaMol..23.1181M, doi:10.1021/ma00206a042

B.	Goldstein, Raymond E.; Pesci, Adriana I.; Shelley, Michael J. (May 1993), "Topology transitions and singularities in viscous flows", Physical Review Letters, 70 (20): 3043–3046, Bibcode:1993PhRvL..70.3043G, doi:10.1103/physrevlett.70.3043, PMID 10053761

C.	Leptos, Kyriacos C.; Guasto, Jeffrey S.; Gollub, J. P.; Pesci, Adriana I.; Goldstein, Raymond E. (November 2009), "Dynamics of enhanced tracer diffusion in suspensions of swimming eukaryotic microorganisms", Physical Review Letters, 103 (19) 198103, Bibcode:2009PhRvL.103s8103L, doi:10.1103/physrevlett.103.198103, PMID 20365957

D.	Goldstein, Raymond E.; Moffatt, H. Keith; Pesci, Adriana I.; Ricca, Renzo L. (December 2010), "Soap-film Möbius strip changes topology with a twist singularity", Proceedings of the National Academy of Sciences, 107 (51): 21979–21984, Bibcode:2010PNAS..10721979G, doi:10.1073/pnas.1015997107, PMC 3009808

E.	Cousins, Thomas R.; Goldstein, Raymond E.; Jaworski, Justin W.; Pesci, Adriana I. (February 2012), "A ratchet trap for Leidenfrost drops", Journal of Fluid Mechanics, 696: 215–227, Bibcode:2012JFM...696..215C, doi:10.1017/jfm.2012.27, S2CID 49549285
