= Tony Maxworthy =

British-American physicist (1933–2013)

- Born: May 21, 1933; Ealing, London
- Died: March 8, 2013 (aged 79); Los Angeles
- Education: Imperial College London; Princeton University; Harvard University
- Scientific career
- Fields: Fluid dynamics
- Workplaces: Jet Propulsion Laboratory; University of Southern California
- Thesis: Flame propagation in tubes (1960)
- Doctoral advisor: Howard Wilson Emmons

Tony Maxworthy (May 1933 in Ealing – 8 March 2013) was a British-American physicist noted for work in geophysical fluid dynamics. He had won the Fluid Dynamics Prize, the Otto Laporte Award, and others.

Maxworthy obtained his bachelor's degree from Imperial College London in 1954 and the Masters from Princeton University in 1955. For his PhD, he joined Harvard University and worked under the supervision of Howard Wilson Emmons, getting his degree in 1960. From 1960 to 1967, he worked in the Jet Propulsion Laboratory and then joined University of Southern California, staying there until his death in 2013.
