= Howard A. Stone =

American engineer (born 1960)

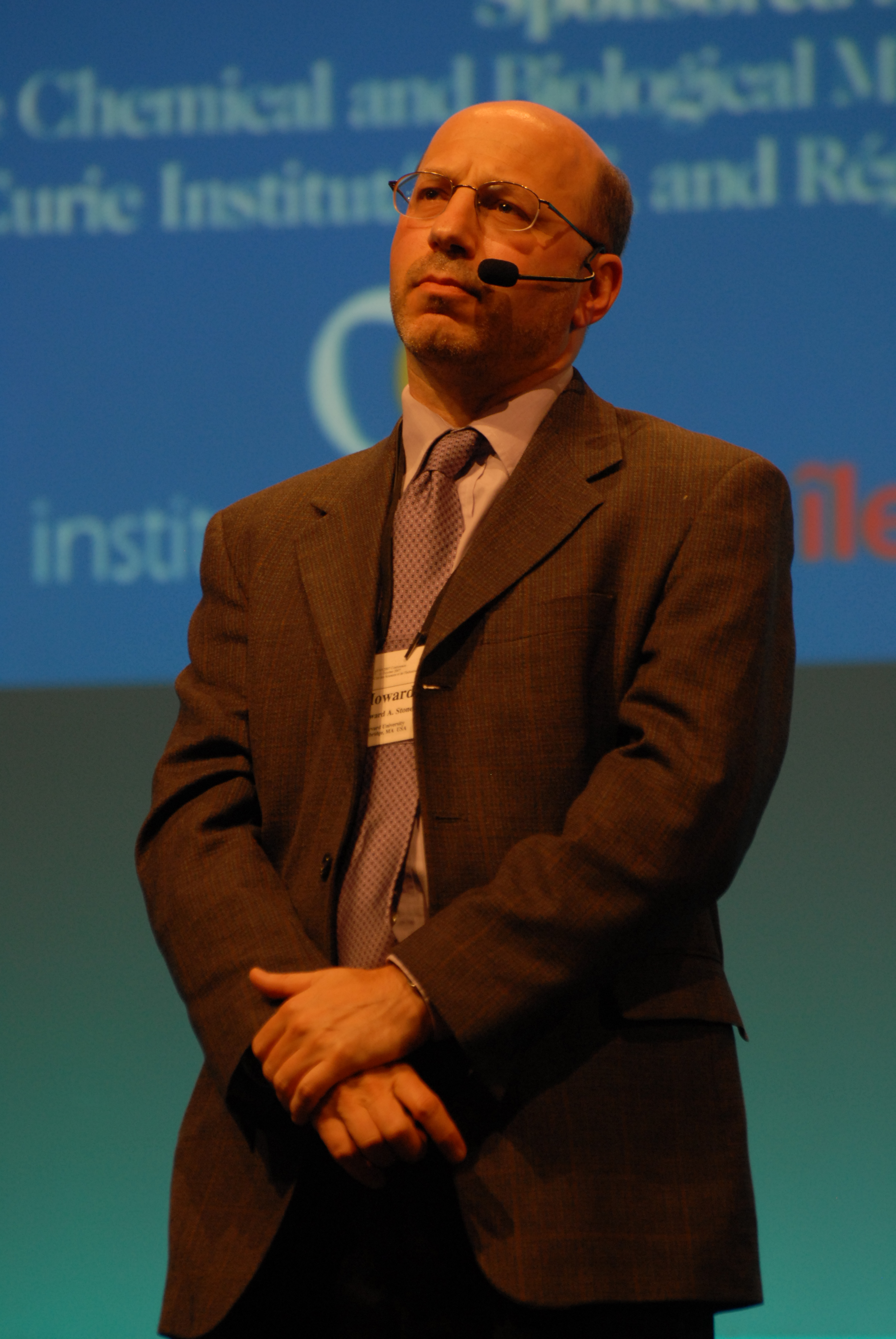
- Howard A. Stone at the MicroTAS Conference, Paris, Oct. 2007.
- Born: January 19, 1960 (age 66)
- Education: University of California, Davis, California Institute of Technology
- Scientific career
- Fields: Fluid dynamics, Mechanical engineering
- Workplaces: Princeton University, Harvard University
- Doctoral advisor: L. Gary Leal

Howard Alvin Stone ForMemRS (born January 19, 1960) is the Neil A. Omenn '68 University Professor in Mechanical and Aerospace Engineering at Princeton University. His field of research is in fluid mechanics, chemical engineering and complex fluids. He became an Editor of the Annual Review of Fluid Mechanics in 2021.

== Career ==
Stone completed his undergraduate studies at University of California, Davis and earned his Ph.D. at the California Institute of Technology under the direction of L. Gary Leal. He joined Princeton in 2009 after twenty years of professorship at the school of engineering at Harvard University, and after spending one year as a postdoctoral fellow in the department of applied mathematics and theoretical physics at Cambridge University. His research has been concerned with a variety of fundamental problems in fluid motions dominated by viscosity, so-called low Reynolds number flows, and has frequently featured a combination of theory, computer simulation and modeling, and experiments to provide a quantitative understanding of the flow phenomenon under investigation.

== Research contributions ==
Stone's studies have been directed toward heat transfer and mass transfer problems involving convection, diffusion and surface reactions. He has made contributions to a wide range of problems involving effects of surface tension, buoyancy, fluid rotation, and surfactants. He has also studied problems concerning the flow of lipid bilayers and monolayers, and has investigated the motions of particles suspended in such interfacial layers. His research on surfactants has important implications for the dispersal of hydrocarbon pollution in aquatic environments. Recent research has extended his study of fluid dynamics and flow within microchannels to biological applications as well. In 2016 he published 54 papers in first class journals.

== Honors and awards ==
Stone is also committed to undergraduate education and outreach to the general public. In 1994 he received both the Joseph R. Levenson Memorial Award and the Phi Beta Kappa teaching Prize, which are the only two teaching awards given to faculty in Harvard College. In 2000 he was named a Harvard College Professor for his contributions to undergraduate education. Currently he also serves as an Academic Athletic Fellow for the Princeton University women's basketball team.

He was elected a Fellow of the American Physical Society in 2003.

He was the first recipient of the most prestigious fluid mechanics prize, the Batchelor Prize 2008, for best research in fluid mechanics in the last ten years.

Stone was elected as a member of the National Academy of Engineering in 2009, a member of the American Academy of Arts and Sciences in 2011, a member of the National Academy of Sciences in 2014, a member of the American Philosophical Society in 2022, and a Foreign Member of the Royal Society (elected 2022).

In 2016, he was awarded the Fluid Dynamics Prize by the American Physical Society.

== Notable papers ==
- Stone, H. A. (1994). "Dynamics of Drop Deformation and Breakup in Viscous Fluids". Annual Review of Fluid Mechanics. 26: 65–102. Bibcode:1994AnRFM..26...65S. doi:10.1146/annurev.fl.26.010194.000433.
- Stone, H. A.; Stroock, A. D.; Ajdari, A. (2004). "ENGINEERING FLOWS IN SMALL DEVICES, Microfluidics Toward a Lab-on-a-Chip". Annual Review of Fluid Mechanics. 36: 381–411. Bibcode:2004AnRFM..36..381S. doi:10.1146/annurev.fluid.36.050802.122124.
- Stone, H. A.; Leal, L. G. (1989). "Relaxation and Breakup of an Initially Extended Drop in an Otherwise Quiescent Fluid" (PDF). J. Fluid Mech. 198: 399–427. Bibcode:1989JFM...198..399S. doi:10.1017/s0022112089000194. S2CID 2882373.
