= Laura Pauley =

American mechanical engineer

Laura Lynn Pauley is an American mechanical engineer specializing in computational fluid dynamics, including the simulation of cavitation, flow separation, and large eddy simulation, with applications including the design of airfoils, boat propellers, and centrifugal pumps. She is a professor of mechanical engineering in the Penn State College of Engineering, the former Arthur L. Glenn Professor of Engineering Education at Penn State, and the interim executive director of the Penn State faculty senate.

== Education and career ==
Pauley is a 1984 graduate of the University of Illinois Urbana-Champaign, majoring in mechanical engineering. She went to Stanford University for graduate study with Parviz Moin; she earned a master's degree there in 1985 and completed her Ph.D. in 1988.

At Penn State, she was Arthur L. Glenn Professor of Engineering Education from 2005 to 2010, and was appointed interim executive director of the faculty senate beginning in 2022.

== Book ==
With Stephen R. Turns, Pauley is the coauthor of the textbook Thermodynamics: Concepts and Applications (Cambridge University Press, 2020).

== Recognition ==
Pauley was named an ASME Fellow in 2012.
