= Roshko number =

Dimensionless parameter in fluid mechanics

In fluid mechanics, the Roshko number (Ro) is a dimensionless number describing oscillating flow mechanisms. It is named after the Canadian Professor of Aeronautics Anatol Roshko. It is defined as

$$\mathrm{Ro} = {f L^{2}\over \nu} =\mathrm{St}\,\mathrm{Re}$$

$$\mathrm{St}= {f L\over U},$$

$$\mathrm{Re} = {U L\over \nu}$$

where

- St is the dimensionless Strouhal number;
- Re is the Reynolds number;
- U is mean stream velocity;
- f is the frequency of vortex shedding;
- L is the characteristic length (for example hydraulic diameter);
- ν is the kinematic viscosity of the fluid.

== Correlations ==
Roshko determined the correlation below from experiments on the flow of air around circular cylinders over range Re=50 to Re=2000:

$\mathrm{Ro} = 0.212 \mathrm{Re} - 4.5$ valid over [ 50 <= Re < 200]
$\mathrm{Ro} = 0.212 \mathrm{Re} - 2.7$ valid over [200 <= Re < 2000]

Ormières and Provansal investigated vortex shedding in the wake of a sphere and found a relationship between Re and Ro in the range 280 < Re < 360.
