= Andreas Acrivos =

Greek–American physicist (1928–2025)

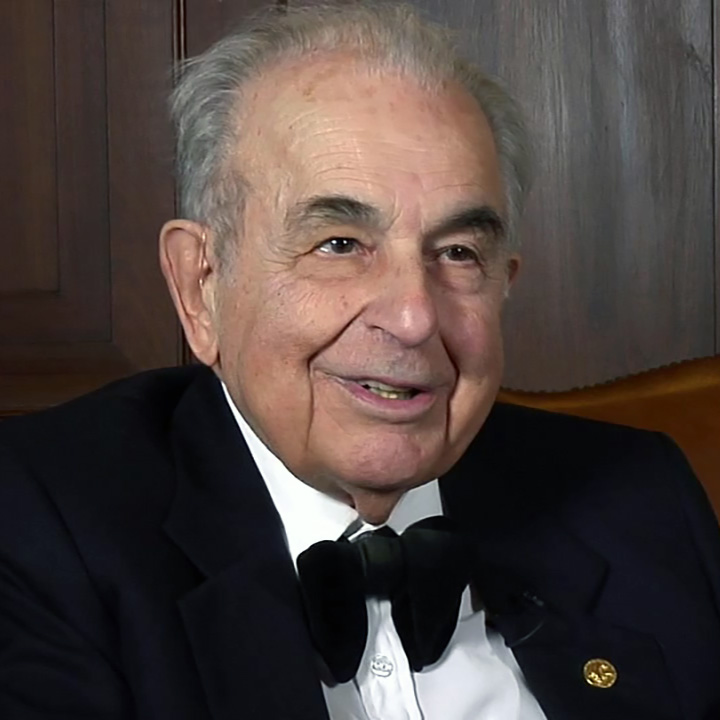
- Born: 13 June 1928; Athens, Greece
- Died: 17 February 2025 (aged 96); Stanford, California, U.S.
- Education: Syracuse University; University of Minnesota
- Awards: Fluid Dynamics Prize (APS) (1991); National Medal of Science (2001)
- Scientific career
- Fields: Fluid dynamics
- Workplaces: University of California, Berkeley; Stanford University; City College of New York
- Doctoral advisor: Neal Amundson
- Doctoral students: Gary Leal; John F. Brady

Andreas Acrivos (13 June 1928 – 17 February 2025) was a Greek-American physicist who was the Albert Einstein Professor of Science and Engineering at the City College of New York. He was also the director of the Benjamin Levich Institute for Physicochemical Hydrodynamics.

== Life and career ==
Acrivos discussing his life and career.

Born in Athens, Greece, Acrivos moved to the United States to pursue an engineering education. He received a bachelor's degree from Syracuse University in 1950; a master's degree from the University of Minnesota in 1951; and a Ph.D. from the University of Minnesota in 1954, all in chemical engineering.

Acrivos is considered to be one of the leading fluid dynamicists of the 20th century. In 1954, Acrivos joined the faculty at the University of California, Berkeley. In 1962, he moved to Stanford University, where he worked with Professor David Mason to build chemical engineering programs. In 1977, he was elected as a member into the National Academy of Engineering for contributions in the application of mathematical analysis to the understanding of fundamental phenomena in chemical engineering processes. In 1987, Acrivos joined as the Albert Einstein Professor of Science and Engineering at The City College of the City University of New York, succeeding Veniamin Levich.

From 1982 to 1997, Acrivos served as the editor-in-chief of Physics of Fluids.

Acrivos died in Stanford, California, on 17 February 2025, at the age of 96.

== Awards and honors ==
- National Medal of Science, 2001
- Fellow of the American Academy of Arts and Sciences, 1993
- Fluid Dynamics Prize, 1991
- G. I. Taylor Medal, Society of Engineering Science, 1988
- Elected as a member into the National Academy of Engineering, 1977
- Acrivos has been listed as an ISI Highly Cited Author in Engineering by the ISI Web of Knowledge, Thomson Scientific Company.
