= Fluid Dynamics Prize (APS) =

Award of the American Physical Society

The Fluid Dynamics Prize is a prize that has been awarded annually by the American Physical Society (APS) since 1979. The recipient is chosen for "outstanding achievement in fluid dynamics research". The prize is currently valued at US$10,000. In 2004, the Otto Laporte Award—another APS award on fluid dynamics—was merged into the Fluid Dynamics Prize.

== Recipients ==
The Fluid Dynamics Prize has been awarded to:

- 2023: Elisabeth Guazzelli
- 2022: Elisabeth Charlaix
- 2021: David_Quéré
- 2020: Katepalli Sreenivasan
- 2019: Alexander Smits
- 2018: Keith Moffatt
- 2017: Detlef Lohse
- 2016: Howard A. Stone
- 2015: Morteza Gharib
- 2014: Geneviève Comte-Bellot
- 2013: Elaine Surick Oran
- 2012: John F. Brady
- 2011: Tony Maxworthy
- 2010: E. John Hinch
- 2009: Stephen B. Pope
- 2008: Julio M. Ottino
- 2007: Guenter Ahlers
- 2006: Thomas S. Lundgren
- 2005: Ronald J. Adrian
- 2004: George M. Homsy
- 2003: Jerry Gollub
- 2002: Gary Leal
- 2001: Howard Brenner
- 2000: Friedrich Hermann Busse
- 1999: Daniel D. Joseph
- 1998: Fazle Hussain
- 1997: Louis Norberg Howard
- 1996: Parviz Moin
- 1995: Harry L Swinney
- 1994: Stephen H. Davis
- 1993: Theodore Yao-tsu Wu
- 1992: William R. Sears
- 1991: Andreas Acrivos
- 1990: John L. Lumley
- 1989: William W. Willmarth
- 1988: Galen B. Schubauer
- 1987: Anatol Roshko
- 1986: Robert T. Jones
- 1985: Chia-Shun Yih
- 1984: George Carrier
- 1983: Stanley Corrsin
- 1982: Howard W. Emmons
- 1981: Philip S. Klebanoff
- 1980: Hans Wolfgang Liepmann
- 1979: Chia Chiao Lin

== See also ==
- List of physics awards
