= Dimitri Papamoschou =

Greek-American aerospace engineer

- Born: 1959 (age 66–67)

Academic background
- Education: Syracuse University (BS); California Institute of Technology (MS, PhD)
- Thesis: Experimental investigation of heterogeneous compressible shear layers (1987)
- Doctoral advisor: Anatol Roshko

Academic work
- Institutions: University of California, Irvine
- Main interests: Compressible flow; turbulence; aeroacoustics; noise suppression; fluid mechanics

Dimitri Papamoschou (Greek: Δημήτρης Παπαμοσχού; born 1959) is a Greek and naturalized-American aerospace engineer and fluid dynamicist. He is Chancellor's Professor of Mechanical and Aerospace Engineering at the University of California, Irvine (UCI). He is known for his research in compressible flow, turbulence, and for developing devices that reduce supersonic jet engine noise.

== Early life and education ==
Papamoschou earned a B.S. in Mechanical & Aerospace Engineering from Syracuse University in 1981. He joined the Guggenheim Aeronautical Laboratory and earned a Master of Science in 1982 and doctorate in Aeronautics in 1987 from the California Institute of Technology. His work focused on supersonic mixing layers and compressible turbulent flows under Anatol Roshko.

== Career ==
In 1988, Papamoschou joined the University of California, Irvine as an assistant professor in the Department of Mechanical and Aerospace Engineering. He later became full professor and was appointed chair of the Department of Mechanical and Aerospace Engineering from 2002 to 2005. He also served as associate dean of the UC Irvine Samueli School of Engineering.

His research specializes in high-speed turbulent shear flow, jet aeroacoustics, and noise reduction for aircraft propulsion systems. Papamoschou has developed experimental and theoretical methods for flow diagnostics and holds several patents in jet noise suppression and fluid mixing enhancement. He also developed an air muffler device to absorb supersonic Mach wave shocks on jet aircraft engines. His research has contributed to fundamental understandings of high-speed turbulent flows and mixing enhancement techniques for supersonic propulsion, leading to novel aerospace technology applications.

He is a fellow of the American Institute of Aeronautics and Astronautics (AIAA).
