= Anatol Roshko =

Canadian-American physicist and engineer (1923–2017)

- Born: July 15, 1923; Bellevue, Alberta, Canada
- Died: January 23, 2017 (aged 93); Altadena, California, U.S.
- Known for: Roshko number
- Spouse: Renee Byrnes
- Awards: Timoshenko Medal (1999)

Academic background
- Education: University of Alberta (BSc); California Institute of Technology (MS, PhD)
- Thesis: On the development of turbulent wakes from vortex streets (1953)
- Doctoral advisor: Hans W. Liepmann

Academic work
- Institutions: Guggenheim Aeronautical Laboratory; California Institute of Technology
- Notable students: Morteza Gharib; Dimitri Papamoschou

Anatol Roshko (15 July 1923 – 23 January 2017) was a Canadian-born physicist and engineer who made fundamental contributions to fluid dynamics and the study of turbulence. He was the Theodore von Kármán Professor of Aeronautics, Emeritus, at the California Institute of Technology.

== Early life and education ==
Roshko was born in Bellevue, Alberta in the Dominion of Canada in 1923. He completed his undergraduate education at the University of Alberta, where he earned a B.Sc. degree in Engineering Physics in 1945. After a brief tour in the Royal Canadian Artillery, he moved to Caltech's Guggenheim Aeronautical Laboratory, where he earned an M.Sc. degree in 1947 and a Ph.D. in 1952. He studied under Hans W. Liepmann and wrote a thesis on turbulence in vortex wakes. As a graduate student, he conducted research through the National Advisory Committee on Aeronautics (NACA), the predecessor to NASA.

== Career ==
Roshko spent his career at Caltech, beginning as a research fellow in 1952 and a senior fellow in 1954. He was appointed assistant professor in 1958 and attained tenure in 1958 before becoming a full professor in 1962. Roshko was named von Kármán Professor in 1985 and retired in 1994. He served as director of the Guggenheim Aeronautical Laboratory (GALCIT) from 1985 to 1987.

In the decades following 1952, he was regarded as a seminal fluid dynamics theorist, modeler, and experimentalist. Roshko is known for his contributions to gas dynamics and turbulence using high-speed imaging. He co-authored the widely used textbook Elements of Gasdynamics with his former advisor, Hans W. Liepmann. He made influential research contributions to problems of flow separation, bluff-body aerodynamics, and the structure of turbulent shear flow. He also studied shock wave–boundary layer interactions using shock tube technology.

Apart from scientific research, he was a consultant for the Office of Naval Research and companies including McDonnell Douglas, Rockwell International, and General Motors. In 1970, he helped organize the Wind Engineering Research Council and served on its executive board until 1983.

Roshko was an elected member of the National Academy of Sciences and National Academy of Engineering. He was a fellow of the American Institute of Aeronautics and Astronautics (AIAA), the American Physical Society (APS), the Canadian Aeronautics and Space Institute, the American Academy of Arts and Sciences, and an Honorary Fellow of the Indian Academy of Sciences.

He died in his home in Altadena, California, on January 23, 2017, aged 93.

== Awards ==
- Fluid Dynamics Prize (APS) (1987)
- Timoshenko Medal (1999)
- Distinguished Alumni Award, University of Alberta
- Reed Aeronautics Award (AIAA)
- Fluid Dynamics Award (AIAA)

== Books ==
- Liepmann, H.W.; Roshko, A. (1993) [1957], Elements of gasdynamics, Courier Dover Publications, ISBN 0-486-41963-0

== See also ==
- Roshko number
- Turbulence
- Turbulent flow
- Vortex
