= Richard Ernest Kronauer =

Richard Ernest Kronauer (1925 – October 18, 2019) was the emeritus Gordon McKay professor of mechanical engineering at Harvard University. He conducted research in both fluid mechanics and applied mathematics.

He is primarily known for his pioneering work in mathematical biology, especially his research on human circadian rhythms. Kronauer's 1982 paper "Mathematical model of the human circadian system with two interacting oscillators" outlined a new method for understanding the biological circuits that underlie daily body cycles in variables such as blood pressure or body temperature. Professor Kronauer's research also has direct implications for the causes and possible cures for many types of sleep disorders, and for this he received the Farrell Prize in Sleep Medicine in June 2008.

== Biography ==
- Born in 1925
- BS in mechanical engineering from Stevens Institute of Technology in 1947
- MS in mechanical engineering from Harvard University in 1948
- PhD in mechanical engineering from Harvard University in 1951
  - Dissertation: Secondary Flows in Fluid Dynamics, with advisor Howard Wilson Emmons
- Stayed at Harvard after PhD, and eventually named Gordon McKay professor (sometime before 1976)
- Wife Joanne Edwards Kronauer
- As of March 2008, Professor Kronauer is listed as co-inventor on 6 patents for devices relating to circadian rhythm: US Patent Numbers 5163426, 5176133, 5167228, 5304212, 5503637, 5545192
- Co-inventor for pending patent application 11/113,356, filed Apr 25, 2005
- Co-inventor for a reciprocating actuator (patent #3312842, 1964) and a fluid operating apparatus (patent #3274795, 1964)
- Died October 18, 2019.

== Well-known students ==
- Steven H. Strogatz, PhD, Harvard University, 1986

== Frequent collaborators ==
- Charles Czeisler
- Charles Stromeyer
- Alex Chaparro

== Selected publications ==
- RE Kronauer. "Secondary Flows in Fluid Dynamics," Harvard University Dissertation, 1951.
- TA McMahon and RE Kronauer. "Tree structures: deducing the principle of mechanical design," J Theor Biol 59: 443–466, 1976.
- RE Kronauer, CA Czeisler, SF Pilato, MC Moore-Ede and ED Weitzman. "Mathematical model of the human circadian system with two interacting oscillators," Am J Physiol 242:R3-R17, 1982.
- CA Czeisler, JS Allan, SH Strogatz, JM Ronda, R Sanchez, CD Rios, WO Freitag, GS Richardson, and RE Kronauer. "Bright light resets the human circadian pacemaker independent of the timing of the sleep-wake cycle," Science 233(4764):667–671, August 1986.
- MC Khoo, RE Kronauer, KP Strohl and AS Slutsky. "Factors inducing periodic breathing in humans: a general model," J App Physiology 53(3):644–659, 1986.
- CA Czeisler, RE Kronauer, JS Allan, JF Duffy, ME Jewett, EN Brown, and JM Ronda. "Bright light induction of strong (type 0) resetting of the human circadian pacemaker," Science 244(4910):1328–1333, 1989.
- DB Boivin, JF Duffy, RE Kronauer, and CA Czeisler. "Dose-response relationships for resetting of human circadian clock by light," Nature 379:540–542 (February 1996).
- CA Czeisler, JF Duffy, TL Shanahan, EN Brown, JF Mitchell, DW Rimmer, JM Ronda, EJ Silva, JS Allan, JS Emens, DJ Dijk, and RE Kronauer. "Stability, Precision, and Near-24-Hour Period of the Human Circadian Pacemaker," Science 284(5423):2177–2181, 1999.
