= Detlef Lohse =

German academic (born 1963)

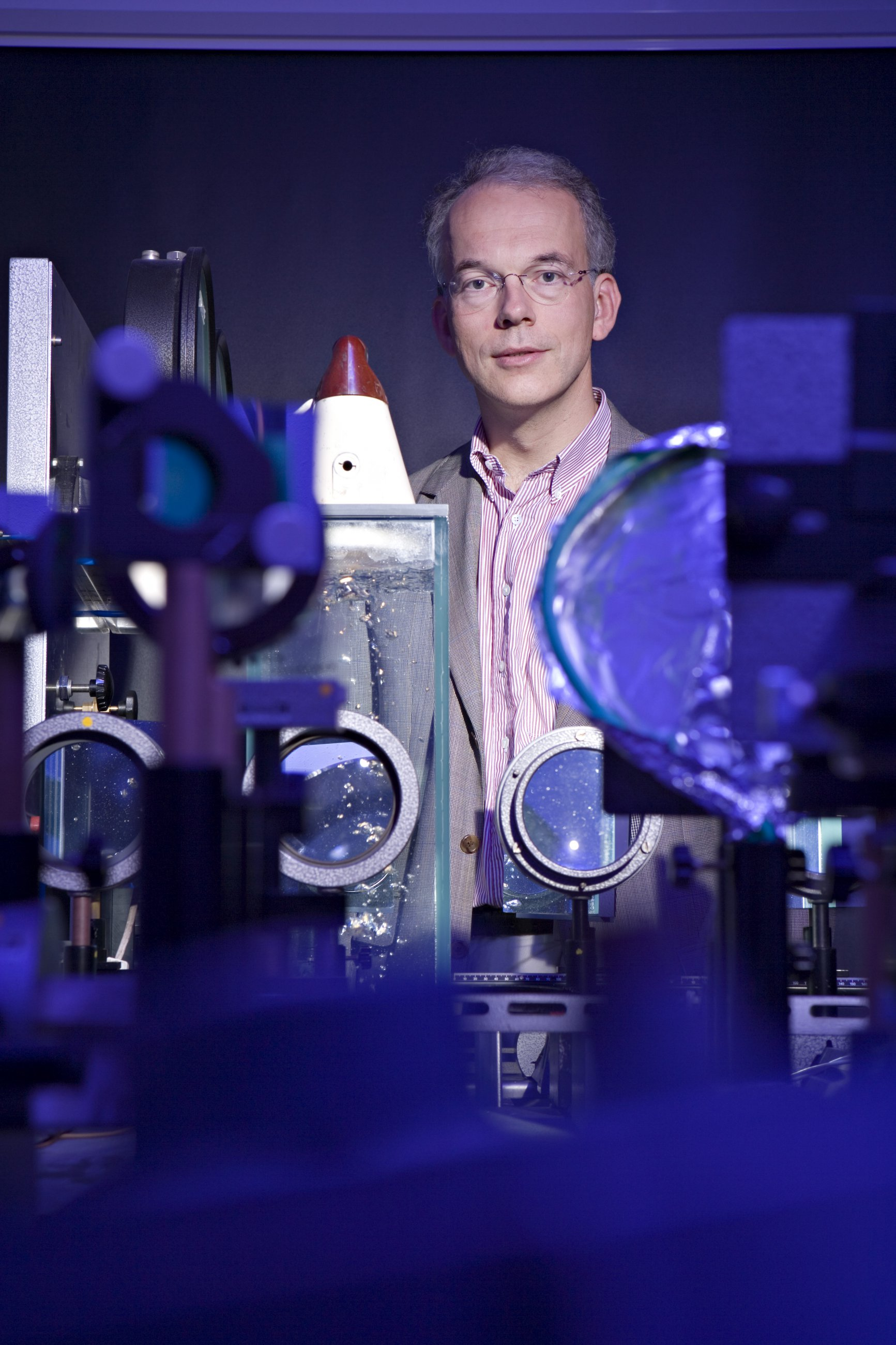
- Lohse in 2005
- Born: September 15, 1963 (age 63); Hamburg, Germany
- Education: University of Kiel; University of Bonn; University of Marburg
- Scientific career
- Workplaces: University of Twente; Max Planck Institute for Dynamics and Self-Organization
- Doctoral advisor: Siegfried Grossmann
- Other academic advisors: Leo Kadanoff
- Website: pof.tnw.utwente.nl/people/profile/3 www.ds.mpg.de/2807298/detlef_lohse

Detlef Lohse FRS (born 15 September 1963 in Hamburg) is a German physicist (fluid dynamicist) and professor in the University of Twente's Department of Physics of Fluids in the Netherlands.

== Biography ==
Lohse studied at the University of Kiel and University of Bonn, graduating in Bonn in 1989 with a degree in physics, and completed his PhD at the University of Marburg in 1992 with Professor Siegfried Grossmann on "Fully developed turbulence," receiving his doctorate summa cum laude (with distinction). He served as a postdoctoral research fellow at the University of Chicago with Leo Kadanoff from 1993 to 1995, which he later described as a formative experience in his scientific career. In 1997 he got his habilitation in theoretical physics at the University of Marburg on the subject of Sonoluminescence. He joined University of Twente in 1998 where he leads the Physics of Fluids department.

Lohse has been an external member of the Max Planck Institute for Dynamics and Self-Organization in Göttingen, Germany since 2015. Since 2016, he is a founding member of the Max Planck Center for Complex Fluid Dynamics at University of Twente.

He is married with two children.

== Scientific work and recognition ==
Lohse's research spans a wide range of topics in fluid dynamics. His present work includes turbulence and two-phase flows, thermal convection, granular flow, micro- and nanofluidics, and the biomedical application of bubbles.

Lohse's work spans diverse areas of fluid dynamics. His research on turbulence and two-phase flows includes studies of fully developed turbulence, particularly thermally driven turbulence (Rayleigh–Bénard convection) and Taylor–Couette flow. His groundbreaking work on bubble dynamics and sonoluminescence (the emission of light from acoustically driven bubbles) helped solve a longstanding scientific puzzle by explaining the phenomenon through bubble shape stability, diffusive stability, chemical stability, and energy focusing. In the field of micro- and nanofluidics, he investigates fluid behavior at microscopic and nanoscopic scales. His research on inkjet printing explores the fluid dynamics challenges in printing technologies. Lohse has conducted pioneering work on surface nanobubbles and nanodroplets, studying the stability and properties of nanoscopic bubbles on surfaces. His investigations into granular flows address the complex behaviors of granular materials. Additionally, he researches biomedical applications of bubbles, examining their use in medical diagnostics and treatments. His research philosophy emphasizes cross-fertilization between different areas of fluid dynamics, allowing insights from one field to inform solutions in others.

His research combines experiment, theory, and numerical simulation, addressing both fundamental science and problems with practical applications. As Lohse states in his approach to science: "There is no difference between fundamental and applied research. There is only a difference between good research and bad research." His work has significance for climate science, energy transition, environmental issues, health, high technology, and fundamental fluid mechanics.

One of his most notable contributions was solving the puzzle of single-bubble sonoluminescence, which has applications in ultrasound diagnostics, inkjet printing, underwater acoustics, cavitation, and marine geophysical surveys. Lohse has described his approach to scientific problems as being like solving puzzles, collecting pieces through reading, calculation, experimentation, and numerical simulations until they form a complete picture.

He has published over 773 refereed publications with over 178 of them in the Journal of Fluid Mechanics, making him the largest contributor to that journal. His work has been cited approximately 54,000 times (according to Google Scholar) with an h-index of 122.

Lohse was a recipient of the 2019 Max Planck Medal, 2018 Balzan Prize, 2017 Fluid Dynamics Prize, 2012 Batchelor Prize, 2005 Spinoza Prize for his work on turbulence, thermal convection, multiphase flow, microfluidics, sonoluminescence, and was awarded with a knighthood in the Order of the Netherlands Lion in 2010.

Additional major honors include three European Research Council (ERC) Advanced Grants (2010, 2017, 2023), membership in the National Academy of Engineering of the United States (elected 2017), the Simon-Stevin-Meesterschap Prize (2009), and the AkzoNobel Science Award (2012).

His work has been recognized with numerous "Gallery of Fluid Motion" awards at the American Physical Society Division of Fluid Dynamics meetings, including several Milton van Dyke Prizes for outstanding visual presentations of flow phenomena.

He is also a member of the Royal Netherlands Academy of Arts and Sciences since 2005, a member of the National Academy of Engineering since 2017, a Fellow of the American Physical Society, a member of the German Academy of Sciences "Leopoldina" (elected 2002), a Fellow of the Institute of Physics (elected 2004), a member of the Netherlands Academy of Technology and Innovation (elected 2017), and a Foreign Member of the Royal Society (elected 2025).

== Scientific citizenship ==
Lohse has made substantial contributions to the scientific community through leadership roles, editorial service, conference organization, and mentorship.

=== Leadership in scientific organizations ===
In professional societies, Lohse has served in numerous leadership positions:

- Vice-chair, chair-elect, chair, and past-chair of the American Physical Society's Division of Fluid Dynamics (DFD) Executive Board (2020–2023)
- Chairman of the IUTAM Fluid Mechanics Symposia Panel (2016–2024)
- Elected member of the General Assembly of IUTAM (2018–2024)
- Elected member of the IUTAM Bureau (2020–2024)
- Elected member of the Euromech Council (2004–2010)
- Chairman of the Advisory Board for the Lorentz Center in Leiden (2015–2023)

In Dutch scientific administration, he has served as:

- Member of the board of FOM (2003–2014) and of the executive board of FOM (2007–2016)
- Vice-chair of FOM (2012–2016) and vice-chair of the NWO Exact Sciences "Table for Physics" (2018–2021)
- Chairman of the FOM group on fluid dynamics (2002–2008)
- Member of the KNAW Domeinjury for the selection of new KNAW members (2012–2018)
- Member of the Excellence Commission and of the Committee of Experts for the Excellence Strategy of the German Science Foundation (DFG) (2016–2024)

=== Editorial contributions ===
Lohse has served on numerous editorial boards:

- Associate editor and member of the editorial board of Journal of Fluid Mechanics (2007–present)
- Editor of Science Advances (2019–2021)
- Member of the editorial board of annual reviews of Fluid Mechanics (2008, 2014, 2016–2020)
- Editor and member of the editorial board of Journal of Statistical Mechanics: Theory and Experiment (JSTAT) (2003–present)
- Previously served on editorial boards for Physica D (2003–2015), Nonlinearity (2002–2015), Physical Review E (2003–2008), Journal of Turbulence (2003–2017), and European Physical Journal B (2004–2007)
- Occasional editor for the proceedings of the National Academy of Sciences of the United States of America (PNAS) (2015–present)

=== Conference organization ===
Lohse has organized numerous scientific conferences, workshops, and summer schools:

- Co-organizer of the conference "Droplets 2015" in Twente (220 participants)
- Co-organizer of the conference "Flow14" in Twente (450 participants)
- Co-organizer of the IUTAM Colloquium on "Dispersed multiphase flow" in Mexico (2015)
- Organization of Euromech colloquia and Lorentz Center workshops on "Hydrodynamics of bubbly flows," "Micro- and nanofluidics," and "Contact-line instabilities"
- Organizer of two KNAW webinars on Covid-19 spreading by aerosols (2020 and 2021)
- Initiator and director of the Max-Planck Center "Complex Fluid Dynamics" between Twente and the Max-Planck Institutes in Göttingen and Mainz (2016–2028)

=== Mentorship and education ===
A significant aspect of Lohse's career has been mentoring the next generation of scientists:

- His group has educated more than 120 PhD students, with approximately 30 currently working on their theses
- About 75 of his former PhD students and postdocs now hold professorships worldwide
- Several startup companies have emerged from his Physics of Fluids Department, including ACFD Consultancy, Tide Microfluidics, Bubclean, and Iamfluidics
- Multiple students under his supervision have won national and international prizes for their theses, including the ERCOFTAC da Vinci Award, FOM Prize, Charles Hoogendoorn Award (H. Gelderblom, S. Huisman, V. Sanjay, J. Meijer), and Shell-Master-Thesis Prize in Physics

Lohse has demonstrated his commitment to science education through teaching activities including course lectures on "Physics of Fluids," "Dynamics," and "Advanced Fluid Mechanics," as well as special lectures on topics such as turbulence, granular flow, and stochastic processes.
