= Chia-Chiao Lin =

Chinese-born American mathematician

Chia Chiao Lin
- Born: 7 July 1916; Peking, China
- Died: 13 January 2013 (aged 96); Beijing, China
- Education: California Institute of Technology; University of Toronto; National Tsinghua University
- Known for: Hydrodynamic stability turbulent flow
- Awards: Fluid Dynamics Prize (1979); Timoshenko Medal (1975); Otto Laporte Award (1973)
- Scientific career
- Fields: Applied mathematics
- Workplaces: Caltech; Brown University; MIT
- Thesis: Investigations on the Theory of Turbulence (1944)
- Doctoral advisor: Theodore von Kármán
- Doctoral students: David Benney; Phyllis Fox; Lee Segel; Frank Shu; Linda Sugiyama
- Other notable students: Elizabeth Cuthill

Chinese name
- Traditional Chinese: 林家翹
- Simplified Chinese: 林家翘
Transcriptions
Standard Mandarin
- Hanyu Pinyin: Lín Jiāqiáo
- Wade–Giles: Lin^{2} Chia^{1}-ch'iao^{2}
- IPA: [lǐn tɕjátɕʰjǎʊ]

Chia-Chiao Lin (Chinese: 林家翹; 7 July 1916 – 13 January 2013) was a Chinese-born American applied mathematician and Institute Professor at the Massachusetts Institute of Technology.

Lin made major contributions to the theory of hydrodynamic stability, turbulent flow, mathematics, and astrophysics.

== Biography ==
Lin was born in Beijing with ancestral roots in Fuzhou. In 1937 Lin graduated from the department of physics, Tsinghua University in Beijing.

After graduation he was a teaching assistant in the Tsinghua University physics department. In 1939 Lin won a Boxer Indemnity Scholarship and was initially supported to study in the United Kingdom. However, due to World War II, Lin and several others were sent to North America by ship. Unluckily, Lin's ship was stopped in Kobe, Japan, and all students had to return to China.

In 1940, Lin finally reached Canada and studied at the University of Toronto from which he earned his M.Sc. In 1941. Lin continued his studies in the United States and received his PhD from the California Institute of Technology in 1944 under Theodore von Kármán. His PhD thesis provided an analytic method to solve a problem in the stability of parallel shearing flows, which was the subject of Werner Heisenberg's PhD thesis.

Lin also taught at Caltech between 1943 and 1945. He taught at Brown University between 1945 and 1947. Lin joined the faculty of the Massachusetts Institute of Technology in 1947. Lin was promoted to professor at MIT in 1953 and became an Institute Professor of MIT in 1963. He was President of the Society for Industrial and Applied Mathematics from 1972 to 1974. Lin retired from MIT in 1987.

In 2002, he moved back to China and helped found the Zhou Pei-Yuan Center for Applied Mathematics (ZCAM) at Tsinghua University. He died in Beijing in 2013, aged 96.

== Honors and awards ==
During his career Lin has received many prizes and awards, including:

- The first Fluid Dynamics Prize (from the American Physical Society, in 1979)
- The 1976 NAS Award in Applied Mathematics and Numerical Analysis
- The 1975 Timoshenko Medal
- The 1973 Otto Laporte Award
- Caltech's Distinguished Alumni Award

Lin was a member of the National Academy of Sciences, the American Academy of Arts and Sciences, and the American Philosophical Society, cited in the American Men and Women of Science. and a Fellow of the American Association for the Advancement of Science. Lin was elected Academician of Academia Sinica in 1958, and became a Foreign Member of the Chinese Academy of Sciences in 1994.
