= Howard Emmons =

American professor (1912–1998)

Howard Wilson Emmons
- Born: Howard Wilson Emmons; August 30, 1912; Morristown, New Jersey
- Died: November 20, 1998 (aged 86); Boston
- Education: Stevens Institute of Technology; Harvard University
- Known for: Emmons problem
- Scientific career
- Fields: Fluid dynamics Combustion
- Workplaces: Westinghouse Electric Company; University of Pennsylvania; Harvard University
- Thesis: The drop condensation of vapors (1938)
- Doctoral advisor: John Finnie Downie Smith; Charles Harold Berry
- Doctoral students: Richard Ernest Kronauer; Tony Maxworthy; Ephraim M. Sparrow

Howard Wilson Emmons (1912–1998) was an American professor in the department of Mechanical Engineering at Harvard University. During his career he conducted original research on fluid mechanics, combustion and fire safety. Today he is most widely known for his pioneering work in the field of fire safety engineering. He has been called "the father of modern fire science" for his contribution to the understanding of flame propagation and fire dynamics. He also helped design the first supersonic wind tunnel, identified a signature of the transition to turbulence in boundary layer flows (now known as "Emmons spots"), and was the first to observe compressor stall in a gas turbine compressor (still a major item of research today). He initiated studies on diffusion flames inside a boundary layer, and Emmons problem is named after him. He was eventually awarded the Timoshenko Medal by the American Society of Mechanical Engineers and the 1968 Sir Alfred Egerton Gold Medal from The Combustion Institute.

Upon Professor Emmons' death, Professor Patrick Pagni wrote, "It is not possible to properly summarize the magnitude of Professor Emmons' unique contributions to the establishment of fire safety science as a discipline, other than to call him "Mr. Fire Research".

He continues to be remembered through the Emmons Lecture at International Symposium of The International Association for Fire Safety Science and the Howard W. Emmons Distinguished Scholar Endowment at Worcester Polytechnic Institute.

== Biography ==
- Born in Morristown, New Jersey on August 30, 1912.
- Bachelor of Engineering in mechanical engineering from Stevens Institute of Technology in 1933.
- Master of Engineering in mechanical engineering from Stevens Institute of Technology in 1935.
- Doctor of Science in mechanical engineering for Harvard University in 1938.
  - Advisors were John Finnie Downie Smith and Charles Harold Berry.
- Worked briefly for Westinghouse and the University of Pennsylvania.
- Professor at Harvard from 1940 onwards.
  - Notable student was Richard Ernest Kronauer, who later became an expert on human circadian rhythms.
- US National Academy of Engineering member in 1965.
- US National Academy of Sciences member in 1966.
- Wife Dorothy
- Children Beverly, Scott, and Keith
- Died November 20, 1998

== Awards and honors ==
- American Physical Society Fellow, elected 1946
- Honorary ScD from Stevens Institute of Technology, 1963
- US National Academy of Engineering member, 1965
- US National Academy of Sciences member, 1966
- Egerton Gold Medal from the Combustion Institute, 1968
- 100th Anniversary Medal from Stevens Institute of Technology, 1970
- Stevens Honor Award Medallion from Stevens Institute of Technology, 1970
- Timoshenko Medal from ASME, 1971
- Robert Henry Thurston Lecture Award from ASME
- Named Fire Protection Man of the Year by the Society of Fire Protection Engineers, 1982
- Office of Naval Research Prize from the American Physical Society, 1982
- Fluid Dynamics Prize (APS), 1982
- Arthur B. Guise Medal by the Society of Fire Protection Engineers, 1986

== Selected publications ==
=== Sole Author ===
The Drop Condensation of Vapors
Harvard University Thesis (S.D.), 1938.

Gas dynamics tables for air
Dover: New York, NY, 1947.

Fundamentals of Gas Dynamics
Princeton University Press: Princeton NJ, 1958.

Fluid mechanics and combustion
Proceedings of the 13th International Symposium on Combustion, p. 1-18 Pittsburgh, Pa., Combustion Institute, 1971.

“The Further History of Fire Science” Combustion Science and Technology, 40, 1984 (reprinted in Fire Technology, 21(3), 1985 )

=== Joint ===
Thermodynamic properties of helium to 50.000K
by Wilbert James Lick, Howard Wilson Emmons Harvard University Press: Cambridge, MA, 1962.

Transport properties of helium from 200 to 50.000K
by Wilbert James Lick, Howard Wilson Emmons Harvard University Press: Cambridge, MA, 1965.

The fire whirl
by Howard W. Emmons and Shuh-Jing Ying Proceedings of the 11th International Symposium on Combustion, p. 475-486 Pittsburgh, Pa., Combustion Institute, 1967.

== See also ==
- Howard W Emmons, Memorial Tributes: National Academy of Engineering, Volume 10 (2002) National Academy of Engineering
- TV show where Howard Emmons speaks of the 1980 MGM Las Vegas fire and of the fire code Harvard Video on YouTube
- The Web of Mechanicians
- Howard W. Emmons Papers at WPI
