= Gretar Tryggvason =

American fluid dynamicist (born 1956)

- Born: 1956 (age 69–70); Iceland
- Title: Charles A. Miller Jr. Distinguished Professor

Academic background
- Education: Brown University
- Doctoral advisor: Hassan Aref
- Website: me.jhu.edu/faculty/gretar-tryggvason/ and engineering.jhu.edu/tryggvason/gretar-tryggvason/

Gretar Tryggvason is Department Head of Mechanical Engineering and Charles A. Miller Jr. Distinguished Professor at Johns Hopkins University. He is known for developing the front tracking method to simulate multiphase flows and free surface flows. Tryggvason was the editor-in-chief of Journal of Computational Physics from 2002–2015.

== Area of research ==
Tryggvason has been a leading worker computational fluid dynamics and numerical methods. He is well known for his research on numerical simulations of vortex flows, multiphase flows, free surface flows, and flows with phase changes. For simulating multiphase flows, he and his co-workers have developed a front tracking method that incorporates an unstructured, moving grid within an underlying Eulerian grid.

== Education ==
- Ph.D. – Brown University, Division of Engineering, 1985
- Sc.M. – Brown University, Division of Engineering, 1982
- B.S. – University of Iceland, Mechanical Engineering, 1980

== Professional experience ==
- 2017–Present: Charles A. Miller Jr. Distinguished Professor and Head, Department of Mechanical Engineering, Johns Hopkins University, Baltimore, MD
- 2011 - 2017: Chair, Department of Aerospace and Mechanical Engineering, University of Notre Dame, IN
- 2010 - 2017: Viola D. Hank Professor of Aerospace and Mechanical Engineering, University of Notre Dame, IN
- 2016: Visiting professor, University of Paris VI, France, 6/13-7/9
- 2000 - 2010: Professor and head, Department of Mechanical Engineering. Worcester Polytechnic Institute, MA
- 1999: Visiting scientist, University of Paris VI, France, 4/19-5/8
- 1998: Visiting professor, Institut Universitaire des Systèmes Thermiques Industriels (IUSTI), University of Aix-Marseille, France, 4/15-5/15
- 1994: Visiting research associate, Caltech, 1/1-5/31 (sabbatical)
- 1993 - 1997: Associate chairman, Department of Mechanical Engineering and Applied Mechanics. University of Michigan, Ann Arbor
- 1991 - 1996: Visiting research position, Institute for Computational Mechanics in Propulsion, NASA Lewis Research Center, every summer.
- 1985 - 2000: Professor of Mechanical Engineering and Applied Mechanics. University of Michigan, Ann Arbor. (assistant professor, 1985–1991; associate professor, 1991–1997; professor, 1997 2000)
- 1984 - 1985: Associate research scientist, Courant Institute of Mathematical Sciences, New York University.

== Awards, honors, societies and journal editorships ==
=== Honors and awards ===
- 2019: Thermal Fluids Engineering Award from the American Society of Thermal and Fluids Engineering (ASTFE)
- 2014: Outstanding Paper Award. Journal of Chemical Engineering of Japan
- 2013: Elected Fellow of the American Association for the Advancement of Science
- 2012: ASME Fluids Engineering Award
- 2006: WPI Sigma Xi Outstanding Senior Faculty Research Award
- 2005: The 2005 Computational Mechanics Award from the Computational Mechanics Division of the Japan Society of Mechanical Engineers (JSME)
- 2005: Elected Fellow of the American Society of Mechanical Engineers
- 2000: Elected Fellow of the American Physical Society (Division of Fluid Dynamics)
- 2000: College Award for Service, University of Michigan
- 1997: Best Paper Award. ASEE Annual meeting (with D. Tilbury and S.L. Ceccio)
- 1996: Departmental Award for Service, University of Michigan
- 1991: Departmental Award for Research, University of Michigan
- 1983: Predoctoral Geophysical Fluid Dynamics Fellow, Woods Hole Oceanographic Institution
- 1980, 1981, and 1983: Brown University Fellowships
- 1980: Thor Thors Special Contribution Award (The American-Scandinavian Foundation)
- 1980: Fulbright travel grant

=== Societies ===
- American Society of Thermal and Fluids Engineers, member 2019
- American Nuclear Society, member 2013
- American Society of Engineering Education, member 1998
- American Society of Mechanical Engineers, member 1991. Elected Fellow 2005
- American Association for the Advancement of Sciences, member 1988. Elected Fellow 2013
- Association of Chartered Engineers in Iceland, member 1987–1992
- Society for Industrial and Applied Mathematics, member
- Sigma Xi, member 1982
- American Physical Society, member 1982. Elected Fellow 2000

=== Journal editorships ===
- 2011–Present: Editorial advisory board, International Journal of Multiphase Flow
- 2009–Present: Editorial board, Scientia Iranica, Transaction B: Mechanical Engineering
- 2006–Present: Associate editor, Journal of Applied Fluid Mechanics
- 2002 - 2015: Editor-in-chief, Journal of Computational Physics
- 2002 - 2009: Associate editor, International Journal of Multiphase Flow
- 1992 - 2002: Associate editor, Journal of Computational Physics

== Selected journal publications ==
- H. Xia, J. Lu, and G. Tryggvason. “A Numerical Study of the Effect of Viscoelastic Stresses in Fused Filament Fabrication“ Computer Methods in Applied Mechanics and Engineering. 346 (2019), 242–259.
- J. Lu and G. Tryggvason. “Direct numerical simulations of multifluid flows in a vertical channel undergoing topology changes“ Physical Review Fluids. 3 (2018), 084401.
- M. Ma, J. Lu, and G. Tryggvason. “Using statistical learning to close two-fluid multiphase flow equations for bubbly flows in vertical channels“ Int’l. J. of Multiphase Flow. 85 (2016) 336–347.
- S. Dabiri and G. Tryggvason. “Heat transfer in turbulent bubbly flow in vertical channels“ Chemical Engineering Science. 122 (2015), 106–113.
- M. Ma, J. Lu, and G. Tryggvason. “Using Statistical Learning to Close Two-Fluid Multiphase Flow Equations for a Simple Bubbly System“ Phys. Fluids, 27 (2015) 092101.
- B. Aboulhasanzadeh, S. Thomas, M. Taeibi-Rahni, and G. Tryggvason. “Multiscale computations of mass transfer from buoyant bubbles“ Chemical Engineering Science 75 (2012) 456–467.
- S. Thomas, A. Esmaeeli and G. Tryggvason. “Multiscale computations of thin films in multiphase flows“ Int’l J. Multiphase Flow 36 (2010), 71–77.
- H. Terashima and G. Tryggvason. “A front-tracking/ghost fluid method for fluid interfaces in compressible flows“ J. Comput. Phys. 228 (2009) 4012–4037.
- J. Lu and G. Tryggvason. “Effect of Bubble Deformability in Turbulent Bubbly Upflow in a Vertical Channel“ Phys. Fluids. 20 (2008), 040701
- M. Muradoglu and G. Tryggvason. “A front-tracking method for computation of interfacial flows with soluble surfactants“ J. Comput. Phys. 227 (2008), 2238–2262.
- J. Lu, A. Fernandez, and G. Tryggvason. “The effect of bubbles on the wall shear in a turbulent channel flow“ Phys. Fluids 17 (2005), 095102
- A. Koynov, G. Tryggvason, and J. G. Khinast. “Mass Transfer and Chemical Reactions in Bubble Swarms with Dynamic Interfaces“ AIChE Journal 10 (2005), 2786–2800.
- A. Fernandez, J. Che, S.L. Ceccio, and G. Tryggvason. “The Effects of Electrostatic Forces on the distribution of Drops in a Channel Flow—Two-Dimensional Oblate Drops“ Phys. Fluids 17 (2005), 093302
- A. Esmaeeli and G. Tryggvason. “Computations of Film Boiling. Part I: Numerical Method“ Int’l. J. of Heat and Mass Transfer 47 (2004), 5451–5461.
- S. Nas and G. Tryggvason. “Thermocapillary interaction of two bubbles or drops“ Int’l J. Multiphase Flows 29 (2003), 1117–1135.
- N. Al-Rawahi and G. Tryggvason. “Computations of the growth of dendrites in the presence of flow. Part I-Two-dimensional Flow“ J. Comput. Phys. 180 (2002), 471–496.
- B. Bunner and G. Tryggvason. “Dynamics of Homogeneous Bubbly Flows: Part 1. Rise Velocity and Microstructure of the Bubbles“ J. Fluid Mech. 466 (2002), 17–52.
- G. Tryggvason, M. Thouless, D. Dutta, S. L. Ceccio, and D. M. Tilbury. “The New Mechanical Engineering Curriculum at the University of Michigan“ J. Engineering Education 90 (2001), 437–444.
- G. Tryggvason, B. Bunner, A. Esmaeeli, D. Juric, N. Al-Rawahi, W. Tauber, J. Han, S. Nas, and Y.-J. Jan. “A Front Tracking Method for the Computations of Multiphase Flow“ J. Comput. Physics 169 (2001), 708–759.
- S. Mortazavi and G. Tryggvason. “A numerical study of the motion of drops in Poiseuille flow. Part 1. Lateral migration of one drop“ J. Fluid Mech. 411 (2000), 325–350.
- J. Han and G. Tryggvason. “Secondary Breakup of Liquid Drops in Axisymmetric Geometry—Part I, Constant Acceleration“ Phys. Fluids 11 (1999), 3650–3667.
- M. Jaeger, M. Carin, M. Medale, and G. Tryggvason. “The Osmotic Migration of Cells in a Solute Gradient“ Biophysical Journal 77 (1999), 1257–1267.
- G. Agresar, J.J. Linderman, G. Tryggvason, and K.G. Powell. “An Adaptive, Cartesian, Front-Tracking Method for the Motion, Deformation and Adhesion of Circulating Cells“ J. Comput. Phys 143 (1998), 346–380.
- D. Juric and G. Tryggvason. “Computations of Boiling Flows“ Int’l. J. Multiphase Flow. 24 (1998), 387–410.
- A. Esmaeeli and G. Tryggvason. “Direct Numerical Simulations of Bubbly Flows. Part I—Low Reynolds Number Arrays“ J. Fluid Mech. 377 (1998), 313–345.
- E.A. Ervin and G. Tryggvason. “The Rise of Bubbles in a Vertical Shear Flow“ ASME J. Fluid Engineering 119 (1997), 443–449.
- D. Juric and G. Tryggvason. “A Front Tracking Method for Dendritic Solidification“ J. Comput. Phys. 123 (1996), 127–148.
- M.R. Nobari, Y.-J. Jan and G. Tryggvason. “Head-on Collision of Drops--A Numerical Investigation“ Phys. Fluids 8 (1996), 29–42.
- S.O. Unverdi, G. Tryggvason. “A Front Tracking Method for Viscous Incompressible Flows“ J. Comput. Phys. 100 (1992), 25–37.
- G. Tryggvason. “Numerical Simulation of the Rayleigh-Taylor Instability“ J. Comput. Phys, 75 (1988), 253–282.
- G. Tryggvason and H. Aref. “Numerical Experiments on Hele Shaw Flow with a Sharp Interface“ J. Fluid Mech., 136 (1983), 1-30.

== Books ==
- A. Prosperetti and G. Tryggvason (editors and main contributors). Computational Methods for Multiphase Flow. Cambridge University Press, 2007. Paperback edition 2009.
- G. Tryggvason, R. Scardovelli and S. Zaleski. Direct Numerical Simulations of Gas-Liquid Multiphase Flows. Cambridge University Press. 2011.
- G. Tryggvason and D. Apelian (editors and contributors). Shaping Our World: Engineering Education for the 21st Century. John Wiley and Sons, Inc., 2011
