= Hans W. Liepmann =

American engineer and academic (1914–2009)

- Born: July 3, 1914; Berlin, Prussia, Germany
- Died: June 24, 2009 (aged 94); La Cañada Flintridge, California
- Education: Universität Zürich
- Scientific career
- Workplaces: California Institute of Technology
- Thesis: The sound velocity in liquid oxygen as a function of the boiling temperature at frequencies of 7.5 and 1.5 × 10 6 Hz Hz (1938)
- Doctoral advisor: Richard Bär
- Doctoral students: Stanley Corrsin; Frank E. Marble; Satish Dhawan; Arthur E. Bryson; Anatol Roshko; Roddam Narasimha

Hans Wolfgang Liepmann (July 3, 1914 – June 24, 2009) was an American fluid dynamicist, aerospace scientist and emeritus Theodore von Kármán Professor of Aeronautics at the California Institute of Technology.

He is known for his numerous contributions in fluid mechanics covering a wide range of problem areas, such as flow instability and turbulence, gas kinetics, viscous compressible fluids and liquid helium flows.

== Academic history ==
Hans Liepmann received a Dr.Ing.h.c. from the University of Aachen and a Ph.D. from the University of Zurich in 1938.

On July 31, 1939 Liepmann arrived in New York, to join Theodore von Kármán at Caltech as a Research Fellow in Aeronautics. He became Assistant Professor of Aeronautics in 1945, Associate Professor in 1946 and Professor from 1949 to 1974. From 1974 to 1976 he was Professor of Aeronautics and Applied Physics, from 1976 to 1983 Charles Lee Powell Professor of Fluid Mechanics and Thermodynamics and 1984-85 von Kármán Professor of Aeronautics. From 1972 to 1985 Liepmann was Director of the Guggenheim Aeronautical Laboratory and Executive Officer for Aeronautics from 1976 to 1985.

He retired in 1985, but remained the emeritus von Kármán Professor at Caltech.

Liepmann received several awards, a selection:

- 1968: Ludwig-Prandtl-Ring from Deutsche Gesellschaft für Luft- und Raumfahrt
- 1980: Fluid Dynamics Prize by the American Physical Society
- 1985: Otto Laporte Award by the American Physical Society
- 1986: National Medal of Science
- 1986: Daniel Guggenheim Medal
- 1993: National Medal of Technology for "Outstanding research contributions to the field of fluid mechanics"

== Books ==
- 1957: (with Anatol Roshko) Elements of Gas Dynamics, John Wiley & Sons, Dover Publications (2002)
- 1947: (with Allen E. Puckett) Introduction to Aerodynamics of a Compressible Fluid, John Wiley & Sons
