= Parviz Moin =

American engineer

- Born: Parviz Valandani; October 23, 1952 (age 73); Tehran, Iran
- Education: University of Minnesota; Stanford University
- Known for: fluid dynamics, turbulent flows, Computational fluid dynamics
- Awards: Humboldt Prize; Fluid Dynamics Prize (APS) (1996)
- Scientific career
- Fields: Mechanical engineering
- Workplaces: Stanford University
- Doctoral advisor: William Craig Reynolds
- Doctoral students: Laura Pauley

Parviz Moin (Persian: پرویز معین Parviz Mo'in from Tehran, Iran) is a fluid dynamicist. He is the Franklin P. and Caroline M. Johnson Professor of Mechanical Engineering at Stanford University. Moin has been listed as an ISI Highly Cited author in engineering.

== Biography ==
Moin is from Iran, and now lives in California. He received his Bachelor's degree in mechanical engineering from the University of Minnesota in 1974, his Master's degree in mathematics and his Master's and Ph.D degrees in mechanical engineering from Stanford in 1978. Moin became a naturalized U.S. citizen in 1981. He held the posts of National Research Council Fellow, Staff Scientist and Senior Staff Scientist at NASA Ames Research Center. He joined the Stanford faculty in September 1986.

== Research ==
Moin pioneered the use of direct numerical simulation and large eddy simulation techniques for the study of turbulence physics, control and modelling concepts and has written widely on the structure of turbulent shear flows. His current interests include: interaction of turbulent flows and shock waves, aerodynamic noise and hydroacoustics, turbulence control, large eddy simulation and parallel computing.

Moin is the founding director of the Center for Turbulence Research at Stanford and Ames. Established in 1987 as a research consortium between NASA and Stanford, the Center for Turbulence Research is devoted to fundamental studies of turbulent flows. He served as an Editor of the Annual Review of Fluid Mechanics from 2002-2024.

== Awards and honors ==
Moin has been awarded NASA Exceptional Scientific Achievement Medal (1985), Space Act Award, the Lawrence Sperry Award of the American Institute of Aeronautics and Astronautics, and the Humboldt Prize of the Federal Republic of Germany. Moin is a Fellow of the American Physical Society and an elected member of the National Academy of Engineering. He is the recipient of Fluid Dynamics Prize of APS in 1996. In 2010 he was elected a Fellow of the American Academy of Arts and Sciences and in 2011 he was elected to the United States National Academy of Sciences.
