= John Hinch (mathematician) =

John Hinch FRS
- Born: 4 March 1947 (age 79)
- Awards: Fluid Dynamics Prize (APS) (2010)
- Scientific career
- Fields: Fluid mechanics
- Workplaces: Trinity College, Cambridge
- Doctoral advisor: George Batchelor

Edward John Hinch FRS (born 4 March 1947) is a professor of fluid dynamics at the University of Cambridge, and fellow of Trinity College, Cambridge.

His research covers a wide range of fluid dynamics, including micro-hydrodynamics, colloidal dispersion, flow through porous media, polymer rheology and non-Newtonian fluid dynamics. He also works on industrial problems involving fluid dynamics, including collaborating with experimental groups in Paris, Marseille and Toulouse. He lectures undergraduates at the University of Cambridge, is a Director of Studies for Trinity College, and supervises PhD students.

John Hinch has published more than a hundred papers on fluid dynamics. Since 1997 he has been a Fellow of the Royal Society and he is also a Knight of the Ordre National du Mérite of France and a Fellow of the American Physical Society. In 2012, Hinch was elected a member of the National Academy of Engineering for contributions to the mechanics of fluids, suspensions, and polymeric liquids and to industrial processes.
