= Chia-Shun Yih =

- Born: July 25, 1918; Guiyang, Guizhou, China
- Died: April 25, 1997 (aged 78)
- Education: National Central University; University of Iowa
- Known for: Yih plume Yih transformation Yih equation
- Scientific career
- Fields: Fluid dynamics
- Workplaces: Guizhou University; University of Michigan
- Thesis: Free convection due to a point source of heat (1948)
- Doctoral advisor: Hunter Rouse

Chia-Shun Yih (Chinese: 易家训; July 25, 1918 – April 25, 1997) was the Stephen P. Timoshenko Distinguished University Professor Emeritus at the University of Michigan. He made many significant contributions to fluid mechanics. Yih was also a seal artist.

== Biography ==
Yih was born on July 25, 1918, in Guiyang, Guizhou province of China. Yih received his junior middle school education in Zhenjiang, and entered Suzhou High School in 1934 in Suzhou, Jiangsu Province.

In 1937, Yih entered the National Central University and studied civil engineering. Yih graduated in 1941 then did research at a hydrodynamics laboratory in Guanxian (or Guan County; 灌县; current Dujiangyan) of Sichuan province. Yih also worked in a bridge construction company in Guizhou. Later, Yih taught at Guizhou University.

In 1945, Yih went to study at the University of Iowa in the United States, where he obtained his PhD in 1948. Yih served as a professor of the University of Michigan for most of his academic career.

Yih is also well known for his high language talent, which appeared already when he was just a high school student. In his first classes in high school, he could talk fluently with his American English teacher. Yih mastered German soon after he joined the college, and was able to communicate smoothly with the local German missionaries in Chongqing. Later Yih again learned French, and lectured mechanics in French at the University of Paris and the University of Grenoble.

He died on April 25, 1997, of heart failure, in his sleep, while in an airplane over Japan.

== Honors and awards ==
- Theodore von Kármán Medal, 1981
- Fluid Dynamics Prize, from the American Physical Society, 1985
- Otto Laporte Award, 1989

Yih was a member of the National Academy of Engineering (elected 1980), and an academician of the Academia Sinica (elected 1970), and a fellow of the American Physical Society (elected 1959).

== Books ==
- C.-S. Yih, Fluid Mechanics: A Concise Introduction to Theory, West River Press, Ann Arbor (1979).
- C.-S. Yih, Stratified Flows, 2nd ed., Academic Press (1980).
- C.-S. Yih, Fluid Mechanics, West River Press, Ann Arbor (1988).
- C.-S. Yih (Ed.), Advances in Applied Mechanics, Academic Press (1982).
