= Grae Worster =

British fluid dynamicist

Michael Grae Worster (born 16 July 1958) is a British fluid dynamicist at the University of Cambridge. He is a professor at the Department of Applied Mathematics and Theoretical Physics and a Fellow of Trinity College, Cambridge. Since 2007, he has been the editor-in-chief of the Journal of Fluid Mechanics. He is also an associate faculty member of the African Institute for Mathematical Sciences. In 2006, he was elected Fellow of the American Physical Society and of the European Mechanics Society.

== Education ==
In 1979, he obtained a B.A. from the University of Cambridge, where he then continued his studies, completing his Ph.D. there in 1983 under the supervision of Herbert Huppert.

== History of Employment ==
1983–1989: Research Fellow, Trinity College, University of Cambridge, UK.

1983–1985: Instructor, Massachusetts Institute of Technology, USA.

1989–1992: Assistant Professor, Northwestern University, USA.

1992–2000: Assistant Director of Research, DAMTP, University of Cambridge, UK.

2000–2001: Senior Lecturer, DAMTP, University of Cambridge, UK.

2001–2004: Reader, DAMTP, University of Cambridge, UK.

2004–present: Professor, DAMTP, University of Cambridge, UK.

== Personal life ==
He married Jacqueline Bould of Cottenham in June 1988.
