= Stavros Tavoularis =

Canadian physicist

Stavros Tavoularis from the University of Ottawa, was awarded the status of Fellow in the American Physical Society, after they were nominated by their Division of Fluid Dynamics in 2007, for contributions to turbulence, turbulent mixing, vortex dynamics, aerodynamics, thermo-hydraulics, bio-fluid dynamics, and design of flow apparatus and instrumentation. Also, for contributions to education in fluid dynamics and for promoting international collaboration and understanding.

== See also ==
- List of fellows of the American Physical Society (1998–2010)
