= Lee Segel =

- לי סגל
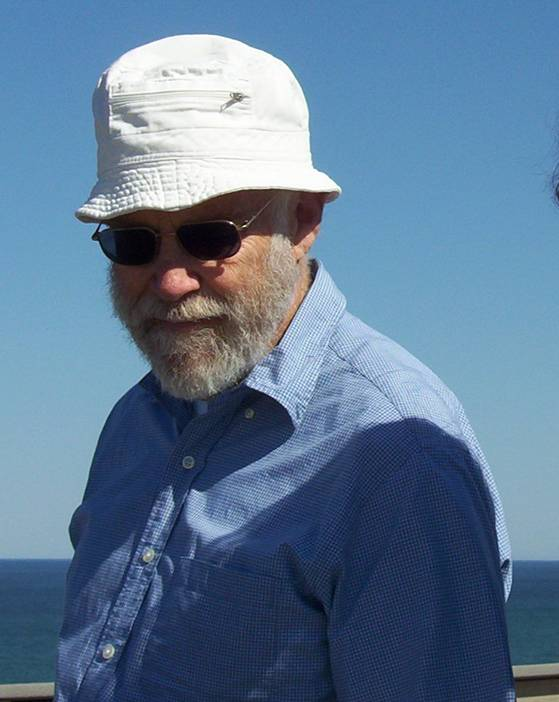
- Lee Segel (1991) Lee Segel (2004)
- Born: Newton, Massachusetts
- Education: MIT
- Spouse: Ruth Galinski
- Scientific career
- Fields: Applied mathematics
- Workplaces: Rensselaer Polytechnic Institute; Weizmann Institute of Science
- Doctoral advisor: C. C. Lin

Lee Aaron Segel (Hebrew: לי סגל; 5 February 1932 – 31 January 2005) was an Israeli-American applied mathematician. He developed both the Keller-Segel model of chemotaxis, in cell biology, and the Newell-Whitehead-Segel equation, in fluid dynamics. He also co-authored the first simulation model for herbicide resistance evolution. He is also considered one of the forefathers of the field of theoretical immunology.

Segel was active in the Santa Fe Institute, the first of the over 50 research centers which focus, today, on complex physical, computational, biological, and social systems. Segel was also editor-in-chief of the Bulletin of Mathematical Biology from 1986 to 2001 and co-authored the first volume in the SIAM Classics in Applied Mathematics series, created by the Society for Industrial and Applied Mathematics. He migrated between numerous prestigious academic institutions worldwide, culminating at Israel's Weizmann Institute of Science, where he served as dean of the Faculty of Mathematics and Computer Science and chair of the Scientific Council.

== Biography ==
Lee Segel was born in 1932 in Newton, Massachusetts to Minna Segel, an art teacher, and Louis Segel, a partner in the Oppenheim-Segel tailors. Louis Segel was something of an intellectual as could be seen in his house from, e.g., the Kollwitz and Beckman prints and the Shakespeare and Co. edition of 'Ulysses', all purchased in Europe in the 1930s. Both parents were of Jewish-Lithuanian origin, of families that immigrated to Boston near the end of the 19th century. The seeds of Segel's later huge vocabulary could partly be seen to stem from his father's reading (and acting on) a claim that the main effect of a prep school was on the vocabulary of its graduates. Segel graduated from Harvard in 1953, majoring in mathematics. Thinking he might want to go into the brand-new field of computers, he started graduate studies in MIT, where he concentrated on applied mathematics instead.

In 1959 he married Ruth Galinski, a lawyer and a distant cousin, in her native London, where they spent the first two years of their wedded life. Later 4 children were born (Joel - 1961, Susan - 1962, Daniel - 1964, and Michael - 1966). In 1973 the family moved to Rehovot, Israel.

He died in 2005.

== Career ==
Lee Segel received a PhD from MIT in 1959, under the supervision of C. C. Lin. In 1960, he joined the Applied Mathematics faculty at Rensselaer Polytechnic Institute. In 1970 he spent a sabbatical at Cornell Medical School and the Sloan-Kettering Institute. Segel moved from RPI to the Weizmann Institute in 1973, where he became the chairman of the Applied Mathematics department, and later dean of the Faculty of Mathematical Sciences and chair of the Scientific Council. At Los Alamos National Laboratory he was a summer consultant to the theoretical biology group from 1984 to 1999, and he was named Ulam Visiting Scholar for 1992–93.

== Hydrodynamics ==
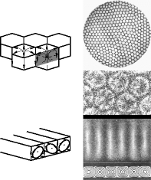
Rayleigh-Bénard Convection

In 1967 Segel and Scanlon were the first to analyze a non-linear convection problem. Segel's most quoted paper in this field was his last work in this field; it was published in parallel with the work of Newell and Whitehead. These papers gave an explanation of the seemingly spontaneous appearance of patterns - rolls or honeycomb cells - in liquid sufficiently heated from below (Bénard convection patterns). (Preceding this was the Turing pattern formation, proposed in 1952 by Alan Turing to describe chemical patterns.)

Amplitude equations are used to study highly complicated complex physical, chemical, or biological systems. Such systems' full dynamics may be governed by complex nonlinear partial differential equations. However, use of amplitude equations which analyze behavior of such systems near the onset of an instability, makes such systems' behaviors far simpler to study. One important amplitude equation is the NWS (Newell-Whitehead-Segel) transient, nonlinear partial differential equation, developed by Segel, and simultaneously by Newell and Whitehead.

== Patterns ==
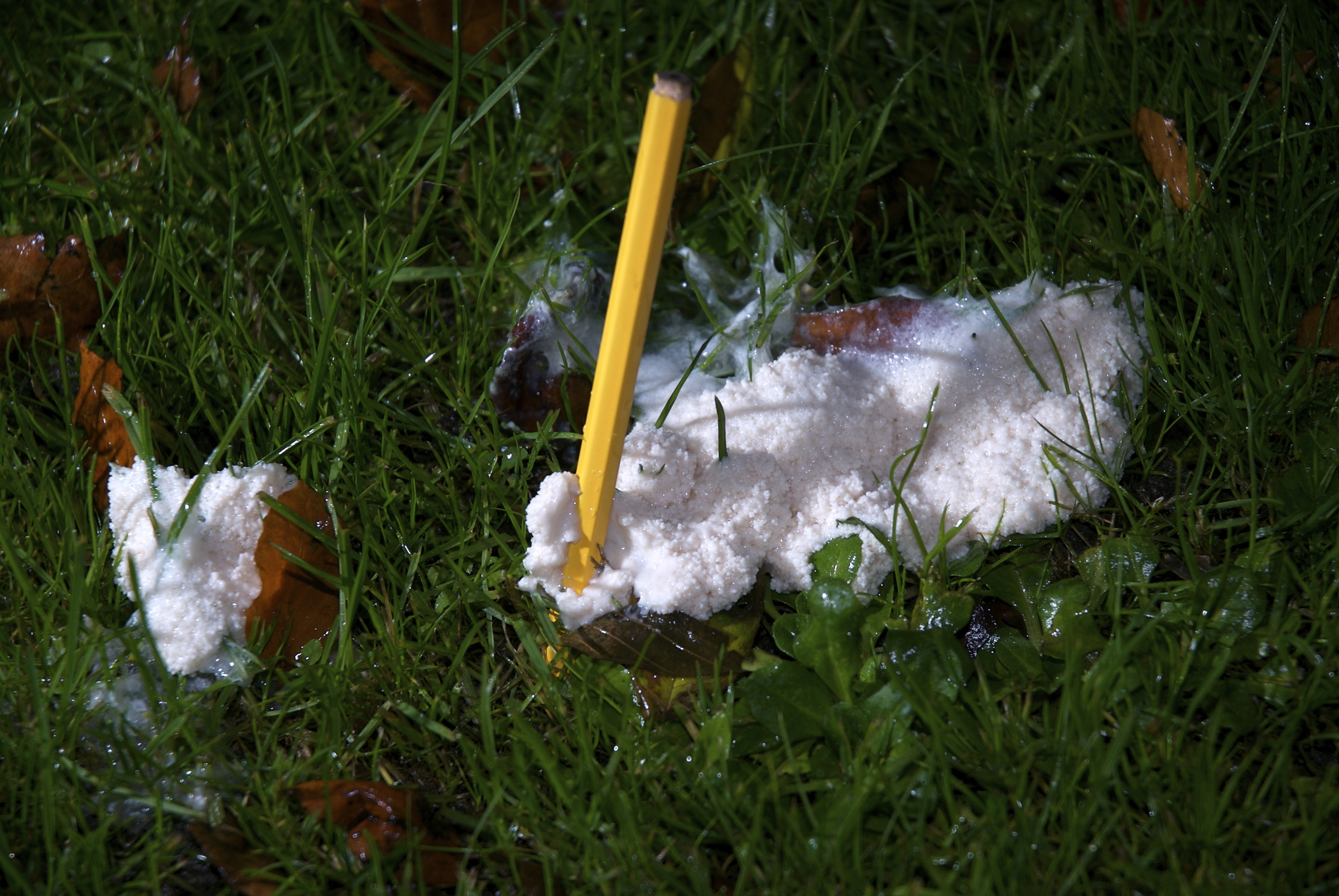
Slime Mold (Mycetozoa Protozo)

Chemotaxis plays important roles in axon guidance, wound healing, tissue morphogenesis and other physiological events.

With Evelyn Keller he developed a model for slime mold (Dictyostelium discoideum) chemotaxis that was perhaps the first example of what was later called an "emergent system"; e.g. in Steven Johnson's 2001 book Emergence: The Connected Lives of Ants, Brains, Cities, and Software. Dictyostelium is 'the main character'. Its amoebas join into a single multicellular aggregate (akin to a multicellular organism) if food runs out; the multicellular aggregate has a better chance to find optimal conditions for spore dispersal. Keller and Segel showed that simple assumptions about an attractive chemical (cyclic AMP), which is both secreted by cells and steers them, could explain such behavior without the need for any master cell that manages the process.

They also developed a model for chemotaxis. Hillen and Painter say of it: "its success ... a consequence of its intuitive simplicity, analytical tractability and capacity to replicate key behaviour of chemotactic populations. One such property, the ability to display 'auto-aggregation,' has led to its prominence as a mechanism for self-organisation of biological systems. This phenomenon has been shown to lead to finite-time blow-up under certain formulations of the model, and a large body of work has been devoted to determining when blow-up occurs or whether globally existing solutions exist".

A paper with Jackson was the first to apply Turing's reaction–diffusion scheme to population dynamics. Lee Segel also found a way to explain the mechanism from a more intuitive perspective than had previously been used.

== Administration ==
In 1975 Segel was appointed Dean of the Faculty of Mathematics in the Weizmann Institute. A central project was renewing the computer science aspect of the department by bringing simultaneously 4 young leading researchers whom he dubbed the 'Gang of Four' - David Harel (Israel Prize '04), Amir Pnueli (Turing Prize '96, Israel Prize '00), Adi Shamir (Turing Prize '02, Wolf Prize '24) and Shimon Ullman (Israel Prize '15).

Segel was the editor of the Bulletin of Mathematical Biology between 1986 and 2002.

== Books ==
Lee Segel was the author of:

- Mathematics Applied to Continuum Mechanics (Classics in Applied Mathematics) (with additional material on elasticity by G. H. Handelman)
- Mathematics Applied to Deterministic Problems in the Natural Sciences (Classics in Applied Mathematics) by C. C Lin and Lee A. Segel. This book was made the first volume in the SIAM Classics in Applied Mathematics series.
- Modeling Dynamic Phenomena in Molecular and Cellular Biology stemmed from his course in mathematical modelling that he taught for 20 years in the Weizmann Inst.

And Editor of:

- Biological Delay Systems: Linear Stability Theory (Cambridge Studies in Mathematical Biology) [Paperback] N. MacDonald, C. Cannings, Frank C. Hoppensteadt and Lee A. Segel (Eds.)
- Mathematical models in molecular and cellular biology.
- Design Principles for the Immune System and Other Distributed Autonomous Systems (Santa Fe Institute Studies in the Sciences of Complexity Proceedings)

== Honors ==
Segel was the Ulam Visiting Scholar of the Santa Fe Institute for 1992–93. The Sixth Israeli Mini-Workshop in Applied Mathematics was dedicated to his memory. Springer Press, in partnership with the Society for Mathematical Biology, funds Lee Segel Prizes for the best original research paper published (awarded every 2 years), a prize of 3,000 dollars for the best student research paper (awarded every 2 years), and a prize of 4,000 dollars for the best review paper (awarded every 3 years). The Faculty of Mathematics and Computer Science at the Weizmann Institute awards a yearly Lee A. Segel Prize in Theoretical Biology.
