= Center for Turbulence Research =

The Center for Turbulence Research is a research consortium for studying turbulence. It is jointly operated by Stanford University and NASA, with Parviz Moin as its founding director. Established in 1987, the Center for Turbulence Research is devoted to fundamental studies of turbulent flows.

The main elements of the Center are a research fellows program, a biennial summer program, seminars and conferences. CTR is known for fundamental studies in turbulent flows along with large scale numerical investigations.
