= John Kim (professor) =

South Korean aerospace engineer

- Hangul: 김정빈
- Hanja: 金正彬
- RR: Gim Jeongbin
- MR: Kim Chŏngbin

Jeongbin John Kim (born 1947) is the Rockwell International Distinguished Professor of mechanical and aerospace engineering in the UCLA Henry Samueli School of Engineering and Applied Science, since 1993. He currently resides in Calabasas, California.

== Personal and early life ==
Kim was born in South Korea. He received his B.S. degree at Seoul National University in 1970; his M.S. at Brown University in 1974; and his Ph.D. at Stanford University in 1978.

== Career ==
Prior to joining UCLA, Kim worked at NASA Ames Research Center, where he conducted research in the areas of turbulence and transition physics as a research scientist and Chief of Turbulence and Transition Physics Branch. His primary research interest is numerical simulation of transitional and turbulent flows, physics and control of turbulent flows, and numerical algorithms for computational science. Kim has been a pioneer in developing direct numerical simulation (DNS) and large eddy simulation (LES) as a reliable and respected tool for studying physics of turbulence. He has been at the forefront of application of a new cutting-edge approach to flow control. His current interest is applying systems control theoretic approach to turbulence control.

John Kim served as Co-Editor-in-Chief of Physics of Fluids from 1998 to 2015.

== Honors ==
John Kim received the NASA Exceptional Scientific Achievement Medal in 1985, H. Julian Allen Award from NASA Ames Research Center in 1994, Otto Laporte Award from the American Physical Society in 2001, Ho-Am Prize in Engineering from the Ho-Am Foundation in 2002, and Distinguished Alumni Award from Seoul National University College of Engineering in 2009. He is a fellow of the American Physical Society.

In 2009, Kim was elected a member of the National Academy of Engineering for the development of direct numerical simulation and seminal contributions to the understanding of the physics and control of turbulent flows.
