= Stanley Corrsin =

American physicist and engineer

- Born: 3 April 1920
- Died: 2 June 1986 (aged 66)
- Education: University of Pennsylvania; California Institute of Technology
- Known for: Turbulence; Corrsin equation
- Awards: Otto Laporte Award (1979); Fluid Dynamics Prize (1983)
- Scientific career
- Fields: Fluid dynamics
- Workplaces: Johns Hopkins University
- Doctoral advisor: Hans Liepmann
- Doctoral students: John Lumley; Mohamed Gad-el-Hak; Stavros Tavoularis

Stanley Corrsin (3 April 1920 – 2 June 1986) was an American physicist, fluid dynamicist, and Theophilus Halley Smoot Professor of Engineering at the Johns Hopkins University. He was known for his contributions in the field of fluid dynamics in general and turbulence in particular. He was a recipient of Fluid Dynamics Prize in 1983. Corrsin died of cancer on 2 June 1986 at the age of 66.

== Education and career ==
Corrsin was born on 3 April 1920 in Philadelphia, Pennsylvania. He received his B.S. from the University of Pennsylvania in 1940. He entered the California Institute of Technology for his graduate studies and worked in the Guggenheim Aeronautical Laboratory under Theodore von Kármán. After receiving his M.S. degree in 1942, Corrsin joined the Ph.D. program under the supervision of Hans Liepmann and obtained the degree in 1947. His thesis work was on the flow of a turbulent jet and he was the first advisee of Liepmann. Corrsin joined the department of aeronautics at Johns Hopkins University in 1947 as an assistant professor. He became an associate professor in 1951 and then was named professor of mechanical engineering in 1955. He served as department chair of mechanical engineering from 1955 to 1960. He was at various times affiliated with the departments of biomedical engineering, chemical engineering, and mechanics and materials science. In 1979, he helped found the department of chemical engineering. In 1981, he became the first Theophilus Halley Smoot Professor of Engineering at Johns Hopkins.

== Principal works ==
Corrsin worked in both experimental and theoretical fluid dynamics. He made a number of fundamental contributions to the study of turbulence, enhancing the understanding of turbulent mixing and the interfaces between turbulent and nonturbulent fluid. In later years, Corrsin developed an interest in various medical and biological problems, including human locomotion, blood flow in the human body, arterial flutter, and the aerodynamics of the albatross and of formation flying in bird flocks. During his 40 years career, Corrsin had published about a hundred research articles and supervised 25 Ph.D. students.

== Awards and honors ==
Corrsin was a recipient of 1983 Fluid Dynamics Prize of The American Physical Society. The citation reads: "In recognition of his contributions to the understanding of turbulent transport, through ingenious experiment and physical insight; his unique experimental approach and critical view of fluid mechanics have touched a legion of students and associates."

In 1986, just before his death, the Engineering Mechanics divisions of the American Society of Civil Engineers awarded him the Theodore von Kármán Medal for his contributions to the study of turbulence. In addition, in 2011, in order "to recognize and encourage a particularly influential contribution to fundamental fluid dynamics", the American Physical Society established the Stanley Corrsin Award. Corrsin was a Member of National Academy of Engineering.

In memory of Professor Stanley Corrsin, the Department of Chemical and Biomolecular Engineering at Johns Hopkins has established the "Stanley Corrsin Lecture in Fluid Mechanics".
