= Journal of Fluid Mechanics =

Peer-reviewed scientific journal

- Discipline: Fluid mechanics
- Language: English
- Edited by: Colm-cille Caulfield

Publication details
- History: 1956–present
- Publisher: Cambridge University Press
- Frequency: Biweekly
- Impact factor: 3.6 (2023)

Standard abbreviations
- ISO 4: J. Fluid Mech.

Indexing
- CODEN: JFLSA7
- ISSN: 0022-1120
- LCCN: 57003918
- OCLC no.: 01782778

Links
- Journal homepage; Online access; Online archive

The Journal of Fluid Mechanics is a peer-reviewed scientific journal in the field of fluid mechanics. It publishes original work on theoretical, computational, and experimental aspects of the subject.

The journal is published by Cambridge University Press and retains a strong association with the University of Cambridge, in particular the Department of Applied Mathematics and Theoretical Physics (DAMTP). Until January 2020, volumes were published twice a month in a single-column B5 format, but the publication is now online-only with the same frequency.

The journal was established in 1956 by George Batchelor, who remained the editor-in-chief for some forty years. He started out as the sole editor, but later a team of associate editors provided assistance in arranging the review of articles. Detlef Lohse is the author who has most papers (180 times) appeared in this journal.

== Editors ==
The following people have been editor (later, editor in chief) of the Journal of Fluid Mechanics:

- 1956–1996: George Batchelor (DAMTP)
- 1966–1983: Keith Moffatt (DAMTP)
- 1996–2000: David Crighton (DAMTP)
- 2000–2006: Tim Pedley (DAMTP)
- 2000–2010: Stephen H. Davis (Northwestern University)
- 2007–2022: Grae Worster (DAMTP)
- 2022–present: Colm-cille P. Caulfield (DAMTP)

== See also ==
- List of fluid mechanics journals
