= Christian Lubich =

Austrian mathematician

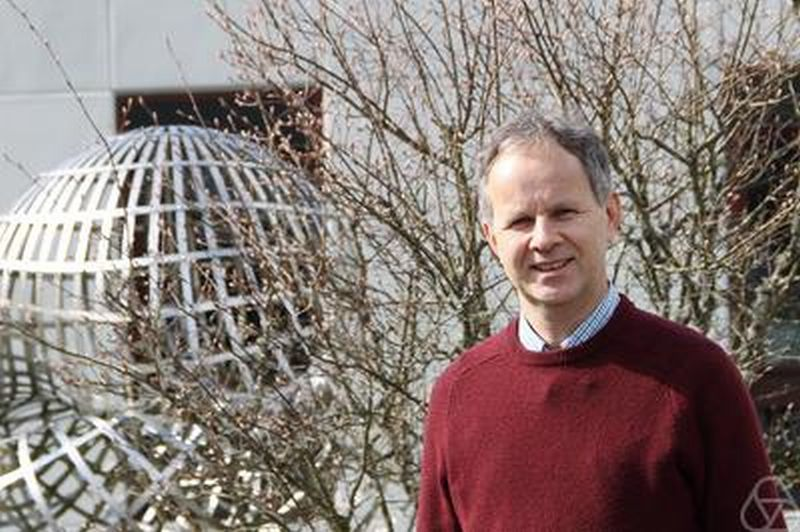
Lubich at Oberwolfach, 2016

Christian Lubich (born 29 July 1959) is an Austrian mathematician, specializing in numerical analysis.

== Education and career ==
After secondary education at the Bundesrealgymnasium in Innsbruck, Lubich studied mathematics at the University of Innsbruck from 1977 to graduation with Magister degree in 1981. He was from 1979 to 1981 a student assistant in Innsbruck and from 1981 to 1983 a research associate in the Sonderforschungsbereich 123 Stochastische mathematische Modelle at the University of Heidelberg. He received his doctorate in 1983 from the University of Innsbruck with dissertation Zur Stabilität linearer Mehrschrittverfahren für Volterra-Gleichungen (On stability of linear multistep methods for Volterra equations) under Ernst Hairer and habilitated there in 1987. Lubich was from 1983 to 1987 a university assistant in Innsbruck, in 1986/87 an assistant at the University of Geneva, in 1987/88 a visiting professor at the IRMAR at the University of Rennes, and in 1988 a visiting professor at the University of Geneva. He was from 1991 to 1992 an assistant professor at ETH Zurich and from 1992 to 1994 a professor of applied mathematics at University of Würzburg. He is since 1994 a professor of numerical mathematics at the University of Tübingen.

Lubich received in 2001 the Dahlquist Prize of the Society for Industrial and Applied Mathematics (SIAM) and in 1985 the Research Prize of the city of Innsbruck. In 2018 at the International Congress of Mathematicians (ICM) in Rio de Janeiro, he was a plenary speaker with talk Dynamics, numerical analysis, and some geometry, written jointly with his former doctoral student Ludwig Gauckler and with Ernst Hairer.

Lubich has been a member of the editorial board of Numerische Mathematik since 1995, of Ricerche di Matematica and of the IMA Journal of Numerical Analysis since 2006, of BIT Numerical Mathematics since 1996, and of SIAM Journal on Scientific Computing from 1996 to 2001.

== Selected publications ==
=== Articles ===
- Hairer, E.; Lubich, Ch.; Schlichte, M. (1985). "Fast Numerical Solution of Nonlinear Volterra Convolution Equations". SIAM Journal on Scientific and Statistical Computing. 6 (3): 532–541. doi:10.1137/0906037.
- Lubich, Christian; Nowak, Ulrich; Pöhle, Uwe; Engstler, Christian (1993). "An overview of MEXX: Numerical Software for the Integration of Multibody Systems". Advanced Multibody System Dynamics. Solid Mechanics and Its Applications. Vol. 20. pp. 421–426. doi:10.1007/978-94-017-0625-4_29. ISBN 978-90-481-4253-8. ISSN 0925-0042. MEXX — Numerical Software for the Integration of Constrained Mechanical Multibody Systems, Preprint SC 92–12 (December 1992)
- Hairer, E.; Lubich, C. (1997). "The life-span of backward error analysis for numerical integrators". Numerische Mathematik. 76 (4): 441–462. doi:10.1007/s002110050271. S2CID 13877070.
- Hairer, Ernst; Lubich, Christian (2000). "Long-Time Energy Conservation of Numerical Methods for Oscillatory Differential Equations". SIAM Journal on Numerical Analysis. 38 (2): 414–441. doi:10.1137/S0036142999353594. S2CID 13174771.
- Hairer, Ernst; Lubich, Christian; Wanner, Gerhard (2003). "Geometric numerical integration illustrated by the Störmer–Verlet method". Acta Numerica. 12: 399–450. doi:10.1017/S0962492902000144.
- Cohen, David; Jahnke, Tobias; Lorenz, Katina; Lubich, Christian (2006). "Numerical Integrators for Highly Oscillatory Hamiltonian Systems: A Review". Analysis, Modeling and Simulation of Multiscale Problems. pp. 553–576. doi:10.1007/3-540-35657-6_20. ISBN 978-3-540-35656-1.
- Lubich, Christian; Oseledets, Ivan V.; Vandereycken, Bart (2015). "Time Integration of Tensor Trains". SIAM Journal on Numerical Analysis. 53 (2): 917–941. arXiv:1407.2042. doi:10.1137/140976546. ISSN 0036-1429. S2CID 13110671.
- Ernst Hairer; Christian Lubich (2015). "IV.12 Numerical solution of ordinary differential equations". In Nicholas J. Higham; Mark R. Dennis; Paul Glendinning; Paul A. Martin; Fadil Santosa; Jared Tanner (eds.). The Princeton Companion to Applied Mathematics. Princeton, NJ: Princeton University Press. pp. 293–305. ISBN 978-0-691-15039-0. MR 3380576; preprint

=== Books ===
- Hairer, Ernst; Lubich, Christian; Roche, Michel (2006-11-14). The Numerical Solution of Differential-Algebraic Systems by Runge-Kutta Methods. Springer. ISBN 978-3-540-46832-5. (pbk reprint of 1989 original)
- Hairer, Ernst; Lubich, Christian; Wanner, Gerhard (2002). Geometric Numerical Integration: Structure-Preserving Algorithms for Ordinary Differential Equations. Springer. ISBN 978-3-540-43003-2.; Hairer, Ernst; Lubich, Christian; Wanner, Gerhard (2006-05-18). 2nd edition. Springer. ISBN 978-3-540-30666-5.
- Lubich, Christian (2008). From Quantum to Classical Molecular Dynamics: Reduced Models and Numerical Analysis. European Mathematical Society. ISBN 978-3-03719-067-8.
