= ICIAM =

ICIAM may refer to:

- International Council for Industrial and Applied Mathematics, an organisation for professional applied mathematics societies.
- International Congress on Industrial and Applied Mathematics, a four-yearly international meeting.
