= Pavel Grinfeld =

American mathematician

- Born: February 10, 1974 (age 52); Moscow, USSR
- Education: Princeton University (B.A.); MIT (Ph.D.)
- Scientific career
- Fields: Mathematics
- Workplaces: Drexel University
- Thesis: Boundary Perturbation of Laplace Eigenvalues (2003)
- Doctoral advisor: Gilbert Strang

Pavel Grinfeld (also known as Greenfield) is an American mathematician and associate professor of Applied Mathematics at Drexel University working on problems in moving surfaces in applied mathematics (particularly calculus of variations), geometry, physics, and engineering.

== Biography ==
Grinfeld received his PhD in Applied Mathematics from MIT in 2003; followed by two years as a postdoctoral fellow at the MIT Department of Earth, Atmosphere and Planetary Sciences, conducting research in geodynamics. He joined the Department of Mathematics at Drexel University in 2005; currently teaching Linear Algebra, Differential Equations, and Tensor calculus.

Grinfeld is the author of the dynamic fluid film equations. Grinfeld co-authored with Haruo Kojima of Rutgers University on the instability of the 2S electron bubbles.

He is the author of a textbook on tensor calculus, a textbook on linear algebra, and an interactive online course in linear algebra. Many of his lectures are available on YouTube as well as other sites.

== Research interests ==
Hydrodynamics and fluid films dynamics, thermodynamics and phase transformations, minimal surfaces and calculus of variations.

== Other Activities ==
Grinfeld is the founder of Lemma, Inc. which has developed the online learning system also called Lemma (https://www.lem.ma).
