= Gerhard Wanner =

Austrian mathematician

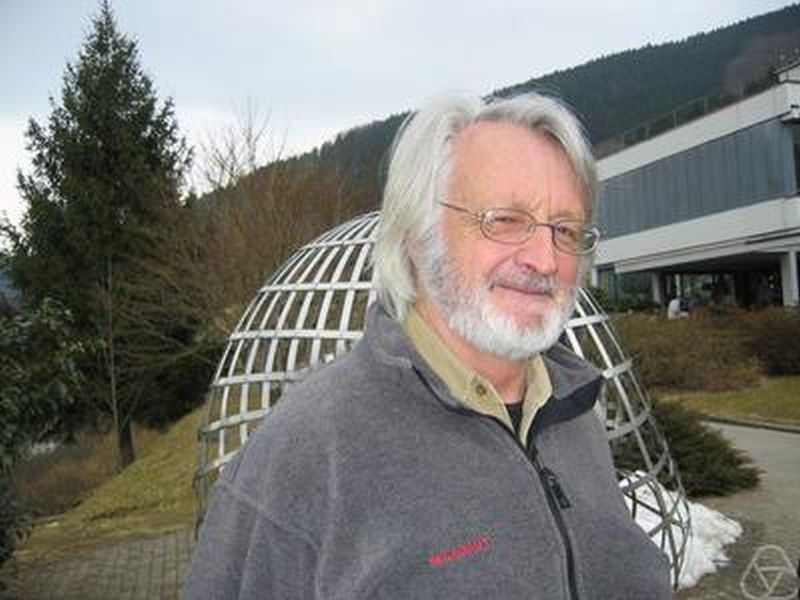
Gerhard Wanner, Oberwolfach 2006

Gerhard Wanner (born 1942 in Innsbruck) is an Austrian mathematician.

== Education and career ==
Wanner grew up in Seefeld in Tirol and studied mathematics at the University of Innsbruck, where he received his doctorate in 1965 with advisor Wolfgang Gröbner and dissertation Ein Beitrag zur numerischen Behandlung von Randwertproblemen gewöhnlicher Differentialgleichungen (A contribution to the numerical treatment of boundary value problems of ordinary differential equations). He taught in Innsbruck and from 1973 at the University of Geneva.

Wanner's research deals with numerical analysis of ordinary differential equations (about which he wrote a two-volume monograph with Ernst Hairer). Wanner is the co-author of an analysis undergraduate textbook and a geometry undergraduate textbook, both of which give historically oriented explanations of mathematics.

In 2003 he was awarded, jointly with Ernst Hairer, the Peter Henrici Prize. In 2015 Wanner received SIAM's George Pólya Prize for Mathematical Exposition.

He was president of the Swiss Mathematical Society from 1998 to 1999.

== Selected publications ==
=== Articles ===
- Hairer, E.; Wanner, G. (1973). "Multistep-multistage-multiderivative methods for ordinary differential equations". Computing. 11 (3): 287–303. doi:10.1007/BF02252917. ISSN 0010-485X.
- Hairer, E.; Wanner, G. (1975). "A theory for Nyström methods". Numerische Mathematik. 25 (4): 383–400. doi:10.1007/BF01396335. ISSN 0029-599X.
- Hairer, E.; Wanner, G. (1981). "Algebraically Stable and Implementable Runge-Kutta Methods of High Order". SIAM Journal on Numerical Analysis. 18 (6): 1098–1108. doi:10.1137/0718074. ISSN 0036-1429.
- Hairer, Ernst; Wanner, Gerhard (1999). "Stiff differential equations solved by Radau methods". Journal of Computational and Applied Mathematics. 111 (1–2): 93–111. doi:10.1016/S0377-0427(99)00134-X. ISSN 0377-0427.
- Hairer, E.; Lubich, C.; Wanner, G. (2003). "Geometric numerical integration illustrated by the Stormer-Verlet method". Acta Numerica. 12 (12): 399–450. doi:10.1017/S0962492902000144. ISBN 978-0-521-82523-8.
- Gander, Martin J.; Wanner, Gerhard (2012). "From Euler, Ritz, and Galerkin to Modern Computing". SIAM Review. 54 (4): 627–666. doi:10.1137/100804036. ISSN 0036-1445.

=== Books ===
- with Ernst Hairer: L'analyse au fil de l'histoire. Springer. 2001. ISBN 978-3-540-67463-4; x+372 pages
  - Hairer, Ernst; Wanner, Gerhard (2008). Analysis by Its History. ISBN 978-0-387-77031-4.
  - Analysis in der historischen Entwicklung. Berlin/Heidelberg: Springer. 2011. ISBN 978-3-642-13766-2.
- with Alexander Ostermann: Geometry by Its History. Springer, Berlin/Heidelberg 2012, ISBN 978-3-642-29162-3.
- with Ernst Hairer and Christian Lubich: Geometric Numerical Integration: Structure-Preserving Algorithms for Ordinary Differential Equations. 2002. 2nd edition. Springer, Berlin/Heidelberg 2010, ISBN 978-3-642-05157-9. pbk reprint
- with Ernst Hairer and Sylvert Nørsett: Solving Ordinary Differential Equations I. Nonstiff Problems (1st ed.). 1987. Hairer, Ernst; Nørsett, Syvert P.; Wanner, Gerhard (1993). Revised 2nd edition. ISBN 978-3-540-56670-0. 3rd corrected printing. Springer, Berlin/Heidelberg 2009, ISBN 978-3-642-05163-0.
- with Ernst Hairer and Sylvert Nørsett: Solving Ordinary Differential Equations II. Stiff and Differential-Algebraic Problems (1st ed.). 1991. 2nd edition. Springer, Berlin/Heidelberg 1996, ISBN 978-3-642-05220-0. 2013 pbk reprint
- Integration gewöhnlicher Differentialgleichungen: Lie-Reihen (mit Programmen), Runge-Kutta-Methoden. BI-Hochschultaschenbücher. Bibliographisches Institut, Mannheim/Zürich 1969.
