= Thomas Hou =

American mathematician (born 1962)

Thomas Y. Hou
- Born: 1962 (age 63–64)
- Education: South China University of Technology (BS); University of California, Los Angeles (PhD)
- Known for: numerical analysis mathematical analysis
- Awards: Member, NAS (2024); Fellow, AMS (2012); Fellow, AAAS (2011); Fellow, SIAM (2009); William Benter Prize (2024); Ralph E. Kleinman Prize (2023); James H. Wilkinson Prize (2001)
- Scientific career
- Fields: Applied mathematics
- Workplaces: New York University; California Institute of Technology
- Doctoral advisor: Björn Engquist

Thomas Yizhao Hou (born 1962) is a Chinese-American mathematician who is the Charles Lee Powell Professor of Applied and Computational Mathematics in the Department of Computing and Mathematical Sciences at the California Institute of Technology. He is known for his work in numerical analysis and mathematical analysis.

== Academic biography ==
Hou studied at the South China University of Technology, where he received a B.S. in mathematics in 1982. He completed his Ph.D. in mathematics at the University of California, Los Angeles in 1987 under the supervision of Björn Engquist. His dissertation was titled Convergence of Particle Methods for Euler and Boltzmann Equations with Oscillatory Solutions. From 1989 to 1993, he taught at the Courant Institute of Mathematical Sciences at New York University. He has been on the faculty of the California Institute of Technology since 1993. He became the Charles Lee Powell Professor of Applied and Computational Mathematics in 2004.

== Research ==
Hou is known for his research on multiscale analysis and singularity formation of the three-dimensional incompressible Euler and Navier–Stokes equations. He is an author of the monograph Multiscale finite element methods. The multiscale finite element method developed by Hou and his former postdoc, Xiao-Hui Wu, was one of the earliest multiscale methods and has found many applications from the engineering community. A variant of his method has been adopted by several major oil companies in their new generation of flow simulators. Hou has worked extensively on computational and analytical aspects of the Euler and Navier-Stokes equations. In 2014, Hou and his former postdoc, Guo Luo, presented convincing numerical evidence that the axisymmetric Euler equations develop finite time singularity from smooth initial data. In 2022, Hou and his former PhD student Jiajie Chen proved the finite time singularity of the axisymmetric Euler equations with smooth data and boundary (the so-called Hou-Luo blowup scenario). Hou’s recent work on the potentially singular behavior of the three-dimensional Navier-Stokes equations has also generated a lot of interests.

Hou is also known for his work in computational fluid dynamics. His early work on the convergence of the point vortex method for incompressible Euler equations was unexpected and considered a breakthrough. The level set method developed by Hou and co-workers was the first level set method for multiphase flows and has found many applications. The Small-Scale Decomposition method developed by Hou-Lowengrub-Shelley was considered a tour de force for fluid interface problems and has been used widely in computational fluid dynamics, materials science, and biology.

Hou was founder of "SIAM Journal on Multiscale Modeling and Simulation", and he served as the editor-in-chief from 2002 to 2007. He was also cofounder of Advances in Adaptive Data Analysis.

== Awards and honors ==
Hou has won several major awards. He received an Alfred P. Sloan Research Fellowship in 1990. He was awarded the Feng Kang Prize in Scientific Computing in 1997 and the Francois Frenkiel Award from the American Physical Society in 1998. He received the James H. Wilkinson Prize in Numerical Analysis and Scientific Computing from the Society for Industrial and Applied Mathematics (SIAM) in 2001, the J. Tinsley Oden Medal from the United States Association of Computational Mechanics in 2005, an ACM Distinguished Member in 2014, the Outstanding Paper Prize from SIAM in 2018, the Ralph E. Kleinman Prize from SIAM in 2023, and the William Benter Prize in Applied Mathematics in 2024. He was an invited speaker at the 1998 International Congress of Mathematicians in Berlin, and he was a plenary speaker at the 2003 International Congress on Industrial and Applied Mathematics in Sydney.

Hou is a Member of the National Academy of Sciences and a Fellow of the American Academy of Arts and Sciences, the Society for Industrial and Applied Mathematics, and the American Mathematical Society.
