= Donald Aronson =

American mathematician (1929–2019)

Donald Aronson (October 2, 1929 – April 17, 2019) was an American mathematician at the University of Minnesota. He was an Elected Fellow of the American Mathematical Society.

== Early life ==
Don Aronson was born on October 2, 1929, in Jersey City, NJ. Despite his humble beginnings, or perhaps because of them, he went on to attend the Massachusetts Institute of Technology after high school. He earned all his degrees — BS, MS, and PhD — from MIT, completing the last one in 1956. His thesis, titled "Boundary Layer Problem for a Liner Parabolic Differential Equation," was written under the guidance of the renowned Norman Levinson.

While still a graduate student in 1954, he secured a summer position as a Scientific Officer at the National Research Development Council (NRDC) in London, England. During this time, he programmed the Alan Turing-designed Ferranti Mark I computer, recognized as the world's first supercomputer. Additionally, he collaborated with Christopher Strachey to simulate the proposed Ferranti Pegasus, which was eventually constructed in 1956.

== Work ==
His initial job was with the Digital Computer Lab at the University of Illinois in Urbana Champaign (UIUC). His role as a Research Associate there was brief lasting only a year. In 1956, he made a move to the University of Minnesota, joining the Department of Mathematics at the then Institute of Technology(now College of Science and Engineering). Don started as an instructor for a year, progressing to Assistant Professor from 1958 to 1962. Impressively, he achieved the rank of Full Professor in 1965, a mere seven years since his initial tenure-track appointment.

Aronson contributed to various domains within partial differential equations and nonlinear dynamics. An examination of his extensive list of publications reveal his involvement in writing papers on nonlinear diffusion, the analytical and computational exploration of bifurcations, pattern formation, mathematical ecology, and mathematical biology.

Remarkably, Don collaborated with more than 40 co-authors, aligning with his perspective that mathematics research is akin to a "team sport". This collaborative approach underscored his belief in the collective nature of advancing mathematical knowledge.

== Honors ==
In June 2001, a conference titled "Nonlinear Phenomena in Science" took place at the Free University of Amsterdam, dedicated to honoring Don on his 70th birthday. This event recognized his significant contributions to the field. In 2013, Don achieved further recognition by being elected to the Inaugural Class of Fellows of the American Mathematical Society.

Aronson entered retirement in June 2002. Shortly after, he was enlisted by Doug Arnold (IMA Director) and Fadil Santosa (Deputy Director) to serve as the first Director of the IMA Postdoctoral Program. In this capacity, he oversaw the selection of postdocs and facilitated their onboarding upon arrival at the IMA in the Fall. He continued in this role until 2010, contributing his expertise to the development and success of the program.
