= Lubich =

Lubich is a surname. Notable people with this name include:

- Berndt Lubich von Milovan, Hauptsturmführer (Captain) in the Waffen SS
- Bronko Lubich (also known as Bronco Lubich), Hungarian-born Canadian professional wrestler
- Chiara Lubich, Italian-born leader of Focolare Movement
- Christian Lubich (born 1959), Austrian mathematician
- David Lubich, editor and publisher of Soul Underground
- Edo Lubich, Balkan musician and member of Tamburitza Orchestra
- Frederick Alfred Lubich, Professor of German, Old Dominion University, Norfolk, Virginia
- Jenia Lubich, Russian singer and recording artiste
- Matthew Lubich, member of Broken Gopher Ink
- Roberta Lubich, former wife of Pier Ferdinando Casini
- Bruce Lubich, Professor of Accounting

== See also ==
- Lubichowo
- Lubichowo Commune
- Lubic, a character in the film Masters of the Universe
- Ruth Lubic
- Europa da się lubić
- Lubicz coat of arms
