= Ernst Hairer =

Austrian mathematician

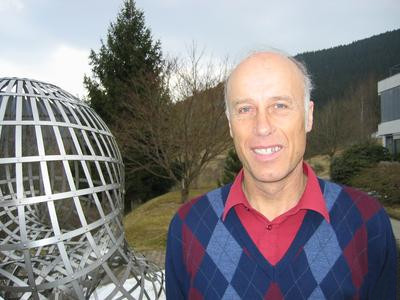
- Hairer at Oberwolfach, 2006
- Born: 19 June 1949 (age 77); Nauders, Tyrol
- Citizenship: Austrian
- Education: University of Geneva
- Children: Martin Hairer
- Awards: Peter Henrici Prize (2003)
- Scientific career
- Fields: Mathematics
- Workplaces: University of Geneva
- Doctoral advisor: Gerhard Wanner
- Doctoral students: Christian Lubich
- Website: www.unige.ch/~hairer

Ernst Hairer (born 19 June 1949) is a professor of mathematics at the University of Geneva known for his work in numerical analysis.

His PhD was completed at the University of Innsbruck.

He is the father of the mathematician Martin Hairer, who won the Fields Medal in 2014.

Hairer is a member of the editorial boards for the journals Mathematics of Computation and Journal of Scientific Computing.

He wrote, with others, Solving Ordinary Differential Equations (Hairer, Nørsett, Wanner) and L'analyse au fil de l'histoire (Hairer, Wanner).

== Awards and honors ==
Hairer holds a doctor honoris causa from the University of Lund.

In 2003 he was awarded, jointly with Gerhard Wanner, the Peter Henrici Prize by the Society for Industrial and Applied Mathematics.

In 2009 a conference on scientific computing and differential equations was held in honor of his 60th birthday, at the University of Geneva, and in the same year the 7th International Conference in Numerical Analysis and Applied Mathematics in Crete was dedicated in his honor.

In 2009–2010 he was John-von-Neumann guest professor at the Technical University of Munich.

== See also ==
- Bulirsch–Stoer algorithm
