= International Council for Industrial and Applied Mathematics =

Organization

- Abbreviation: ICIAM
- Formation: 1987; 39 years ago
- Type: INGO
- Region served: Worldwide
- Official language: English, French
- President: Wil Schilders
- Parent organization: International Council for Science (ICSU)
- Website: ICIAM Official website

The International Council for Industrial and Applied Mathematics (ICIAM) is an organisation for professional applied mathematics societies and related organisations. The current president is Wil Schilders. The cash award for each of the prizes is 5000 USD.

== History ==
Until 1999 the Council was known as the Committee for International Conferences on Industrial and Applied Mathematics (CICIAM). Formed in 1987 with the start of the ICIAM conference series, this committee represented the leaders of four applied mathematics societies: the Gesellschaft für Angewandte Mathematik und Mechanik (GAMM), in Germany, the Institute of Mathematics and its Applications (IMA), in England, the Society for Industrial and Applied Mathematics (SIAM), in the USA, and the Société de Mathématiques Appliquées et Industrielles (SMAI), in France. The first two presidents of the council, Roger Temam and Reinhard Mennicken, oversaw the addition of several other societies as members and associate members of the council; as of 2015 it had 21 full members and 26 associate members. Past Presidents include Olavi Nevanlinna, Ian Sloan, Rolf Jeltsch, Barbara Keyfitz, and María J. Esteban.

== Congress ==
ICIAM organizes the four-yearly International Congress on Industrial and Applied Mathematics, the first of which was held in 1987. The most recent congress was in 2019 in Valencia (Spain), and the next will be in 2023 in Tokyo (Japan). It also sponsors several prizes, awarded at the congresses: the Lagrange Prize for exceptional career contributions, the Collatz Prize for outstanding applied mathematicians under the age of 42, the Pioneer Prize for applied mathematical work in a new field, the Maxwell Prize for originality in applied mathematics, and the Su Buchin Prize for outstanding contributions to emerging economies and human development.

== Collatz Prize ==
The Collatz Prize is awarded by ICIAM every four years at the International Congress on Industrial and Applied Mathematics, to an applied mathematician under the age of 42. It was established in 1999 on the initiative of Gesellschaft für Angewandte Mathematik und Mechanik (GAMM), to recognize outstanding contributions in applied and industrial mathematics.

Named after the German mathematician Lothar Collatz; it is widely regarded as one of the most prestigious prizes for young applied mathematicians.

=== Prize Winners ===
- 1999 Stefan Müller
- 2003 E Weinan
- 2007 Felix Otto
- 2011 Emmanuel Candès
- 2015 Annalisa Buffa
- 2019 Siddhartha Mishra
- 2023 Maria Colombo

== Lagrange Prize ==
The Lagrange Prize is awarded by ICIAM every four years at the International Congress on Industrial and Applied Mathematics, for lifetime achievement in applied mathematics. Named after Joseph-Louis Lagrange, it was established in 1999 on the initiative of Société de Mathématiques Appliquées et Industrielles (SMAI), Sociedad Española de Matemática Aplicada (SEMA) and Società Italiana di Matematica Applicata e Industriale (SIMAI).

=== Prize Winners ===
- 1999 Jacques-Louis Lions
- 2003 Enrico Magenes
- 2007 Joseph Keller
- 2011 Alexandre Chorin
- 2015 Andrew Majda
- 2019 George C. Papanicolaou
- 2023 Alfio Quarteroni

== Maxwell Prize ==
The Maxwell Prize is awarded by ICIAM every four years at the International Congress on Industrial and Applied Mathematics. Established in 1999 and named after James Clerk Maxwell, the prize provides international recognition to a mathematician who has demonstrated originality in applied mathematics. It was created on the initiative of the Institute of Mathematics and its Applications with the support of the James Clerk Maxwell Foundation.

=== Prize Winners ===
- 1999 Grigory Barenblatt
- 2003 Martin David Kruskal
- 2007 Peter Deuflhard
- 2011 Vladimir Rokhlin
- 2015 Jean-Michel Coron
- 2019 Claude Bardos
- 2023 Weinan E

== Pioneer Prize ==
The Pioneer Prize is awarded by ICIAM every four years at the International Congress on Industrial and Applied Mathematics, for pioneering applied mathematical work in a new field. It was established in 1999 on the initiative of the Society for Industrial and Applied Mathematics (SIAM).

=== Prize Winners ===
- 1999 Ronald Coifman and Helmut Neunzert
- 2003 Stanley Osher
- 2007 Ingrid Daubechies and Heinz Engl
- 2011 James Albert Sethian
- 2015 Björn Engquist
- 2019 Yvon Maday
- 2023 Leslie Greengard

== Su Buchin Prize ==
The Su Buchin Prize is awarded by ICIAM every four years at the International Congress on Industrial and Applied Mathematics. Established in 2003 and named after the Chinese mathematician Su Buchin, the prize provides international recognition to outstanding contributions to applying mathematics to emerging economies and human development, including improving teaching and research. It was created on the initiative of the China Society for Industrial and Applied Mathematics (CSIAM), and was first awarded in 2007.

=== Prize Winners ===
- 2007 Gilbert Strang
- 2011 Edward Lungu
- 2015 Li Tatsien
- 2019 Giulia Di Nunno
- 2023 Jose Mario Martinez Perez

== Olga Taussky-Todd Lecture ==
An Olga Taussky-Todd Lecture has been held at each International Congress on Industrial and Applied Mathematics since 2007. Named after Olga Taussky-Todd, the lectureship is conferred upon an outstanding woman applied mathematician.

=== Olga Taussky-Todd Lecturers ===
- 2007 Pauline van den Driessche
- 2011 Beatrice Pelloni
- 2015 Éva Tardos
- 2019 Françoise Tisseur
- 2023 IIse C.F. Ipsen
