= MWX =

MWX may refer to:

- Morley–Wang–Xu element, a canonical construction in applied mathematics
- Muan International Airport (IATA: MWX), South Jeolla Province, South Korea
