= Peter Henrici Prize =

- Description: Contributions to applied analysis, numerical analysis, and scientific computing
- Country: Switzerland / United States
- Presented by: ETH Zurich & Society for Industrial and Applied Mathematics (SIAM)
- Rewards: $5,000 & Certificate
- Website: www.siam.org/prizes-awards/joint-prizes/peter-henrici-prize

The Peter Henrici Prize (German: Peter Henrici Preis; French: Prix Peter Henrici; Italian: Premio Peter Henrici) is a prize awarded jointly by ETH Zurich and the Society for Industrial and Applied Mathematics (SIAM) for "original contributions to applied analysis and numerical analysis and/or for exposition appropriate for applied mathematics and scientific computing". The prize is named in honor of the Swiss numerical analyst Peter Henrici, who was a professor at ETH Zurich for 25 years.

== Description ==
The prize, initiated in 1999 with funds contributed by ETH Zurich, is awarded every four years. It consists of a certificate containing the citation and (as of 2023) a cash prize of $5,000 (US). The winner is chosen by a prize committee, consisting of four members, two members chosen by SIAM and two others by ETH Zurich. "The prize may be awarded to any member of the scientific community who meets the general guideline of the prize description."

== Award ceremony ==
The award is presented every four years at the International Congress on Industrial and Applied Mathematics (ICIAM). The presentation of the prize is made by the SIAM president. The recipient is requested to give a lecture at the conference.

== Prize winners ==
- 1999 : Germund Dahlquist
- 2003 : Ernst Hairer and Gerhard Wanner
- 2007 : Gilbert Strang
- 2011 : Bjorn Engquist
- 2015 : Eitan Tadmor
- 2019 : Weinan E

== See also ==
- Alice Roth Lecture Series
