= Jinchao Xu =

American-Chinese mathematician (born 1961)

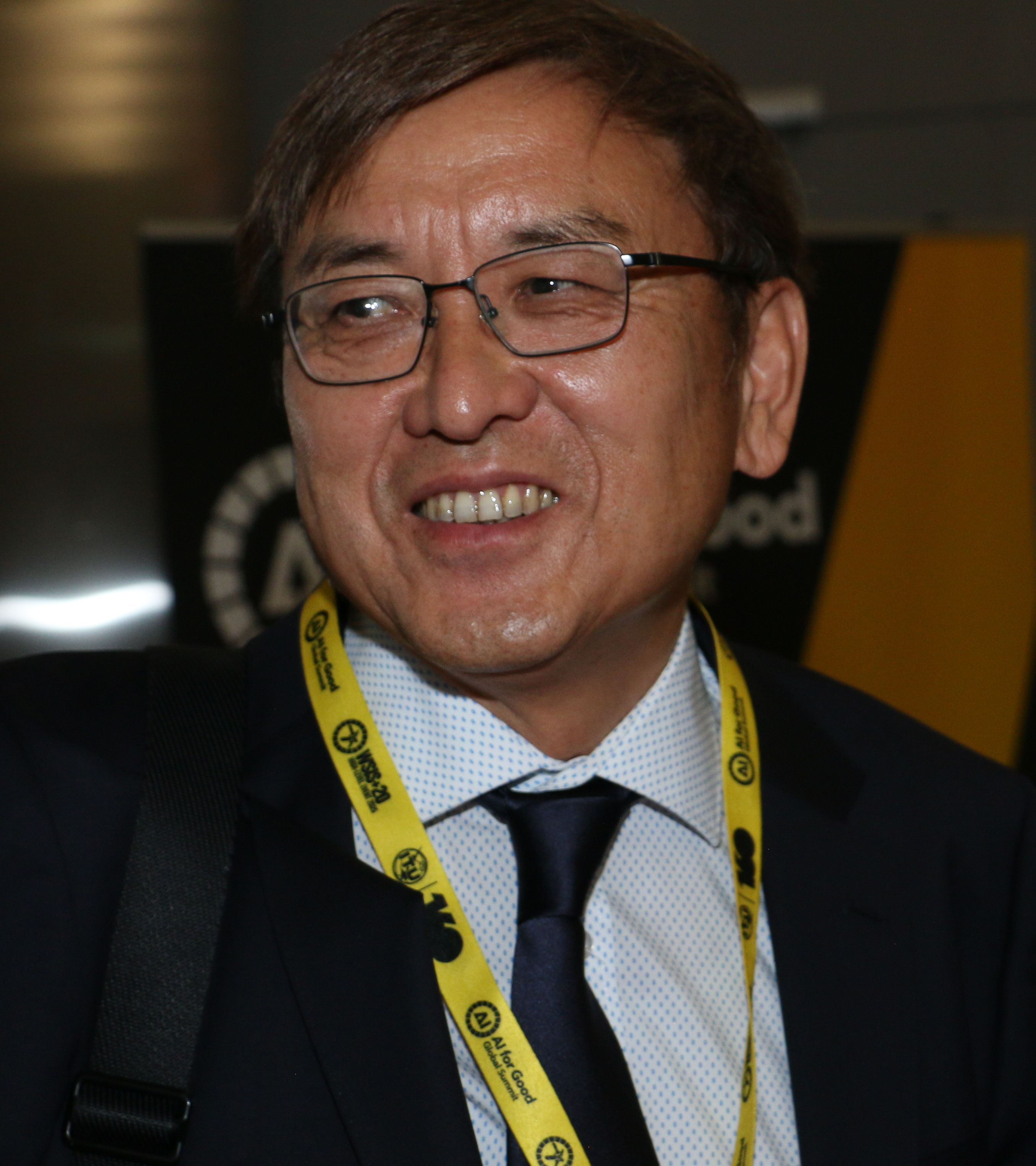
- Xu in 2025
- Born: June 23, 1961 (age 65); Hunan, China
- Education: Peking University; Cornell University
- Known for: application of partial differential equations
- Scientific career
- Fields: Mathematics
- Workplaces: King Abdullah University of Science and Technology
- Doctoral advisor: James H. Bramble

Jinchao Xu (许进超, born 1961) is an American-Chinese mathematician. He is currently Professor of Applied Mathematics and Computational Sciences at King Abdullah University of Science and Technology, Director of KAUST-SRIBD Joint Lab for Scientific Computing and Machine Learning. He founded and directed the KAUST Innovation Hub in Shenzhen. Previously, he was the Verne M. Willaman Professor in the Department of Mathematics at the Pennsylvania State University, University Park. He is known for his work on multigrid methods, domain decomposition methods, finite element methods, and more recently deep neural networks.

== Awards and honors ==
Xu has published nearly 240 scientific papers and was ranked among the most highly cited mathematicians in the world by the Institute for Scientific Information (ISI) (e.g. top 25 worldwide for the years 1991 to 2001). He was a plenary speaker at the International Congress on Industrial and Applied Mathematics in 2007 and a 45-minute invited speaker at the International Congress of Mathematicians 2010, Hyderabad. In 2011, Xu was honored as a Fellow of the Society for Industrial and Applied Mathematics (SIAM) for his outstanding contributions to the theory and applications of multilevel and adaptive numerical methods. In 2012, he was elected as an inaugural Fellow of the American Mathematical Society (AMS). In 2019, he was named a Fellow of the American Association for the Advancement of Science(AAAS). In 2022, he was elected as Fellow of the European Academy of Sciences. In 2023, he was elected as Fellow of the Academia Europaea.

Xu received the Liu Memorial Award at Cornell University in 1988, the Natural Science Award from the National Academy of Science in China in 1989, and the Schlumberger Foundation Award in 1993. In 1995, Xu's research accomplishments were recognized with the first Feng Kang Prize for Scientific Computing from the Chinese Academy of Sciences. In honor of his achievements in computational mathematics research and teaching, he received the Humboldt Award for Senior U.S. Scientists in 2005. He also received the Research Award for National Outstanding Youth (Class B) in 2006 in China. In 2019, Xu was named a Fellow of the American Association for the Advancement of Science(AAAS).
