= Cathleen Synge Morawetz Prize =

Award in applied mathematics

The AMS–SIAM Cathleen Synge Morawetz Prize in Applied Mathematics is awarded jointly by the American Mathematical Society (AMS) and the Society for Industrial and Applied Mathematics (SIAM) in honor of Cathleen Synge Morawetz. Prior to 2025, it was known as the AMS–SIAM George David Birkhoff Prize in Applied Mathematics, in honor of George David Birkhoff. It is currently awarded every three years for an outstanding contribution to "applied mathematics in the highest and broadest sense". The recipient of the prize has to be a member of one of the awarding societies, as well as a resident of the United States, Canada, or Mexico. The prize was endowed in 1967 and first issued in 1968. As of 2026, it amounts to US$5,000.

== Recipients ==
Year	Winner	Reason
1968	Jürgen Moser	"for his contributions to the theory of Hamiltonian dynamical systems, especially his proof of the stability of periodic solutions of Hamiltonian systems having two degrees of freedom and his specific applications of the ideas in connection with this work."
1973	James Serrin and Fritz John	"for his outstanding work in partial differential equations, in numerical analysis, and, particularly, in nonlinear elasticity theory; the latter work has led to his study of quasi-isometric mappings as well as functions of bounded mean oscillation, which have had impact in other areas of analysis."
1978	Clifford Truesdell, Mark Kac, and Garrett Birkhoff	"for bringing the methods of algebra and the highest standards of mathematics to scientific applications."
1983	Paul Garabedian	"for his important contributions to partial differential equations, to the mathematical analysis of problems of transonic flow and airfoil design by the method of complexification, and to the development and application of scientific computing to problems of fluid dynamics and plasma physics."
1988	Elliott H. Lieb	"for his profound analysis of problems arising in mathematical physics."
1994	Ivo Babuška and S. R. Srinivasa Varadhan	"to Ivo Babuška for important contributions to the reliability of finite element methods, the development of a general framework for finite element error estimation, and the development of p- and hp- finite element methods; and to S. R. S. Varadhan for important contributions to the martingale characterization of diffusion processes, to the theory of large deviations for functionals of occupation times of Markov processes, and to the study of random media."
1998	Paul Rabinowitz	"for his deep influence on the field of nonlinear analysis."
2003	John N. Mather and Charles S. Peskin	"to John Mather for being a mathematician of exceptional depth, power, and originality; and to Charles S. Peskin for devoting much of his career to understanding the dynamics of the human heart and bringing an extraordinarily broad range of expertise to bear on this problem."
2006	Cathleen Synge Morawetz	"for her deep and influential work in partial differential equations, most notably in the study of shock waves, transonic flow, scattering theory, and conformally invariant estimates for the wave equation."
2009	Joel Smoller	"for his leadership, originality, depth, and breadth of work in dynamical systems, differential equations, mathematical biology, shock wave theory, and general relativity."
2012	Björn Engquist	"for his contributions to a wide range of powerful computational methods over more than three decades."
2015	Emmanuel Candès	"for his work on compressed sensing that has revolutionized signal processing and medical imaging and his related work on computational harmonic analysis, statistics and scientific computing."
2018	Bernd Sturmfels	"for his instrumental role in creating the field of applied algebraic geometry."
2021	Gunther Uhlmann	"for his fundamental and insightful contributions to inverse problems and partial differential equations, as well as for his incisive work on boundary rigidity, microlocal analysis and cloaking."
2024	Ronald Coifman	"for his profound impact on pure and applied harmonic analysis, and for the introduction of tools developed from these areas to address modern challenges of data science."

== See also ==
- List of mathematics awards
- Prizes named after people
