= Roland Bulirsch =

German mathematician (1932–2022)

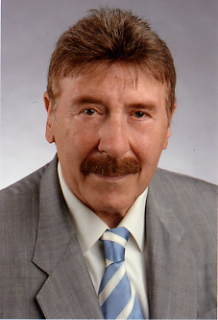
- Born: 10 November 1932; Liberec, Czechoslovakia
- Died: 21 September 2022 (aged 89); Gauting, Germany
- Education: Technische Hochschule München
- Occupation: Mathematician
- Organization: Technical University of Munich
- Known for: Bulirsch–Stoer algorithm

Roland Zdeněk Bulirsch (10 November 1932 – 21 September 2022) was a German mathematician specialising in numerical analysis. He studied and taught at the Technical University of Munich, and taught internationally as visiting professor. He was co-author of the reference book Introduction to Numerical Analysis, and president of the edition of the works by Johannes Kepler. He received honorary doctorates from international universities, and several awards.

== Life and career ==
Bulirsch was born in Liberec (Reichenberg) on 10 November 1932. He had to leave Czechoslovakia in 1946. In 1947, he became an apprentice as a machinist with Siemens-Schuckert in Nuremberg, completing in 1951. He achieved the Abitur in Nördlingen in 1954, and then studied mathematics and physics at the Technical University of Munich to 1959, earning his Ph.D. there in 1961, supervised by Klaus Samelson, and his habilitation in mathematics in 1965. He taught as associated professor at the University of California, San Diego, from 1967 to 1969, and as professor of applied mathematics at the University of Cologne from 1969. He joined the faculty in Munich in 1973.

He was elected a member of the Bavarian Academy of Sciences and Humanities in 1991. In 1998 he became president of the edition of the works by Johannes Kepler. He was emerited in 2001.

Bulirsch specialised in numerical analysis. He is the author (with Josef Stoer) of Introduction to Numerical Analysis, a standard reference for the theory of numerical methods, and has also authored numerous other books and articles. The book From Nano to Space: Applied Mathematics Inspired by Roland Bulirsch is a tribute to his work. The Bulirsch–Stoer algorithm is named after him and Stoer.

Bulirsch received honorary doctorates from the University of Hamburg, the Technical University of Liberec, the National Technical University of Athens and the University of Viên Toán Hoc in Hanoi. He was awarded a medal from the Union of Czech Mathematicians and Physicists, and a medal from the Charles University in Prague. In 1998, he received the Bavarian Maximilian Order for Science and Art, and the following year the Liebig-Denkmünze, the highest award of the Heimatkreis Reichenberg. He was elected to the Sudetendeutsche Akademie der Wissenschaften und Künste the same year. In 2012, he received the Großer Sudetendeutscher Kulturpreis.

=== Personal life ===
Bulirsch and his wife Waltraut had two daughters. She died in 2020.

Bulirsch died in Gauting on 21 September 2022 at age 89.
