= George Fix =

American mathematician

- American mathematician George Fix
- Born: May 10, 1939; Dallas, Texas, US
- Died: March 10, 2002 (aged 62); Clemson, South Carolina, US
- Education: Texas A&M University; Rice University; Harvard University
- Known for: Finite Element Method; Phase-field model
- Scientific career
- Fields: Mathematics
- Doctoral advisor: Garrett Birkhoff

George J. Fix (May 10, 1939 – March 10, 2002) was an American mathematician who collaborated on several seminal papers and books in the field of finite element method. In addition to his work in mathematics, Fix was a beer and homebrewing enthusiast and educator, as well as the author of several books about brewing. He died of cancer in 2002.

== Education ==
Fix was born and grew up in Dallas, Texas, and attended Texas A&M University on a baseball scholarship, where he earned a Bachelor of Science. He received his Master of Science degree from Rice University, and in 1968, he earned a Ph.D. from Harvard.

== Professor of mathematics ==
After earning his Ph.D, Fix stayed at Harvard as an assistant professor until 1972. While there, he met Gilbert Strang, and collaborated with him on a paper regarding the Fourier analysis of finite element methods (FEM). In 1973, he and Strang published An Analysis of the Finite Element Method, a book that gave the latest advances in FEM "publicity and respectability". (Max Gunzburger of Iowa State University called it "one of the most important and influential applied mathematics books ever published.")

Fix moved to University of Maryland in 1972, and then to University of Michigan. He served as the chair of mathematics at Carnegie Mellon University for over 20 years, and served in the same role at University of Texas at Arlington and Clemson University. He also taught at University of Bonn.

During his academic tenure, he published two books and over 100 papers. In addition to his seminal work on FEM, his papers included works on iterative methods, grid generation, and integral equations in the context of FEM. He also made contributions concerning numerical applications of real-world applications, including solid mechanics, acoustics, and jets and sprays, as well as computational geometry as it applied to the modeling of developable surfaces.

== Contributions to brewing ==
Fix also applied his talents to amateur beer brewing. He won hundreds of awards across the United States for his beers, and was named Homebrewer of the Year in 1981 by the American Homebrewers Association (AHA). He was a consultant to numerous microbreweries and brewpubs, and served as an expert witness in brewing-related litigation. He served on the Board of Advisors of the AHA, the editorial board of Brewing Techniques magazine, the steering committee of the Masters Championship of Amateur Brewing, and was a member of Beer Judge Certification Program, the American Association of Brewing Chemists, and the Master Brewers Association of America. In 1999, he wrote Principles of Brewing Science, considered a standard reference for home- and craft-brewers. He also co-authored two books about homebrewing with his wife Laurie, including An Analysis of Brewing Techniques in 1998.

For his achievements and role as an educator in the field of home brewing, Fix was honoured with the AHA Recognition Award in 1991, the Distinguished Service Recognition Award by the Association of Brewers in 1991, and the Ninkasi Award by the AHA in 1997.
