= Gunilla Kreiss =

Swedish applied mathematician

Gunilla Kreiss (born 1958) is a Swedish applied mathematician and numerical analyst specializing in level-set methods and numerical methods for partial differential equations, especially for problems arising in fluid dynamics including two-phase flow, shear flow, and Burgers' equation. She is professor of numerical analysis in the Department of Information Technology, Division of Scientific Computing at Uppsala University, and editor-in-chief of BIT Numerical Mathematics.

== Education and career ==
Kreiss became interested in numerical analysis while studying civil engineering at the KTH Royal Institute of Technology. She earned a master's degree in applied mathematics there in 1982, and completed her PhD in 1986, with the dissertation Analytical and numerical studies of the convergence to steady state of solutions of two model problems of fluid dynamics jointly supervised by Germund Dahlquist and Björn Engquist.

After completing her doctorate, she continued at the KTH Royal Institute of Technology as an assistant professor, beginning in 1987, and was promoted to associate professor in 1993 and full professor in 2003. She headed the Numerical Analysis Group at KTH from 2004 to 2006. She took her present position as professor of numerical analysis at Uppsala University in 2006, and headed the Division of Scientific Computing there beginning in 2012. At Uppsala University, her doctoral students have included Sara Zahedi (PhD 2011), who won the 2016 European Mathematical Society Prize for her work on fluid dynamics.

She was appointed editor-in-chief of the journal BIT Numerical Mathematics in 2017, and later became the sole editor after her co-editor, Lars Eldén, stepped down.

== Personal life ==
Kreiss is the daughter of mathematician Heinz-Otto Kreiss, who also became her academic grandfather and frequent coauthor.
