= Josef Stoer =

German mathematician (born 1934)

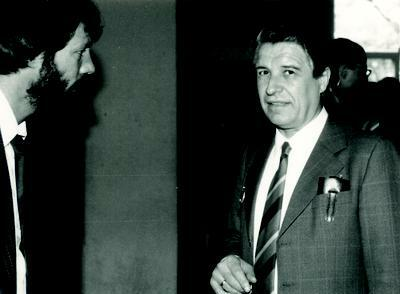
- Stoer at Erlangen in 1987 (courtesy MFO)
- Born: June 21, 1934 (age 92); Meschede, Germany
- Education: Johannes Gutenberg-Universität Mainz
- Scientific career
- Fields: mathematician numerical analysis
- Workplaces: Universität Würzburg
- Thesis: Über zwei Algorithmen zur Interpolation mit rationalen Funktionen (1961)
- Doctoral advisor: Friedrich Ludwig Bauer; Klaus Samelson
- Doctoral students: Bingsheng He
- Website: www.mathematik.uni-wuerzburg.de/personal/stoer.html

Josef Stoer (born 21 June 1934) is a German mathematician specializing in numerical analysis and professor emeritus of the Institut für Mathematik of Universität Würzburg.

Stoer was born in Meschede, and earned his Ph.D. in 1961 at Johannes Gutenberg-Universität Mainz under Friedrich Ludwig Bauer and Klaus Samelson. He has advised over 20 doctoral students.

He is the author (with Roland Bulirsch) of Introduction to Numerical Analysis, a standard reference for the theory of numerical methods. He has an honorary doctorate from the University of Augsburg (2007) and the Technical University of Munich (1997) and is a member of the Bavarian Academy of Sciences (1981). The Bulirsch–Stoer algorithm is named after him and Roland Bulirsch.
