= Claude Bardos =

French mathematician (1940–2026)

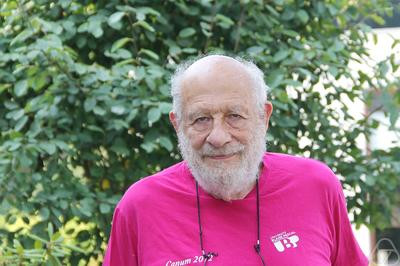
- Bardos in 2015
- Born: Claude Williams Bardos; 4 April 1940
- Died: 16 June 2026 (aged 86)
- Education: University of Paris (DND)
- Occupation: Mathematician

Claude Williams Bardos (French: [klˈod wˈɪli͡əmz baʁdˈo]; 4 April 1940 – 16 June 2026) was a French mathematician who specialized in mathematical physics.

== Life and career ==
Born on 4 April 1940, Bardos earned a Diplôme national de doctorat from the University of Paris and served as a professor at the University of Rouen Normandy, Paris North University, and the École normale supérieure. One of the leading international figures in mathematical physics, he conducted research on the Boltzmann equation and Hilbert's problems alongside François Golse and David Levermore. He wrote 338 publications in scientific journals, focusing primarily on the Encyclopædia Universalis, Éditions techniques de l'ingénieur, Leçons de mathématiques d'aujourd'hui, and Pour la science. He also supervised 36 theses, such as those of Pierre Degond, François Golse, and Catherine Sulem. He was the father of children's illustrator Magali Bardos.

Bardos died on 16 June 2026, at the age of 86.

== Distinctions ==
- Member of the scientific council of the ENS Cachan (1992)
- Prix Edmond-Brun (1992)
- Maxwell Prize of the International Council for Industrial and Applied Mathematics (2019)
- Honorary symposium at the Collège de France (2025)
