= Peter Henrici (mathematician) =

Swiss mathematician (1923–1987)

Peter Karl Henrici
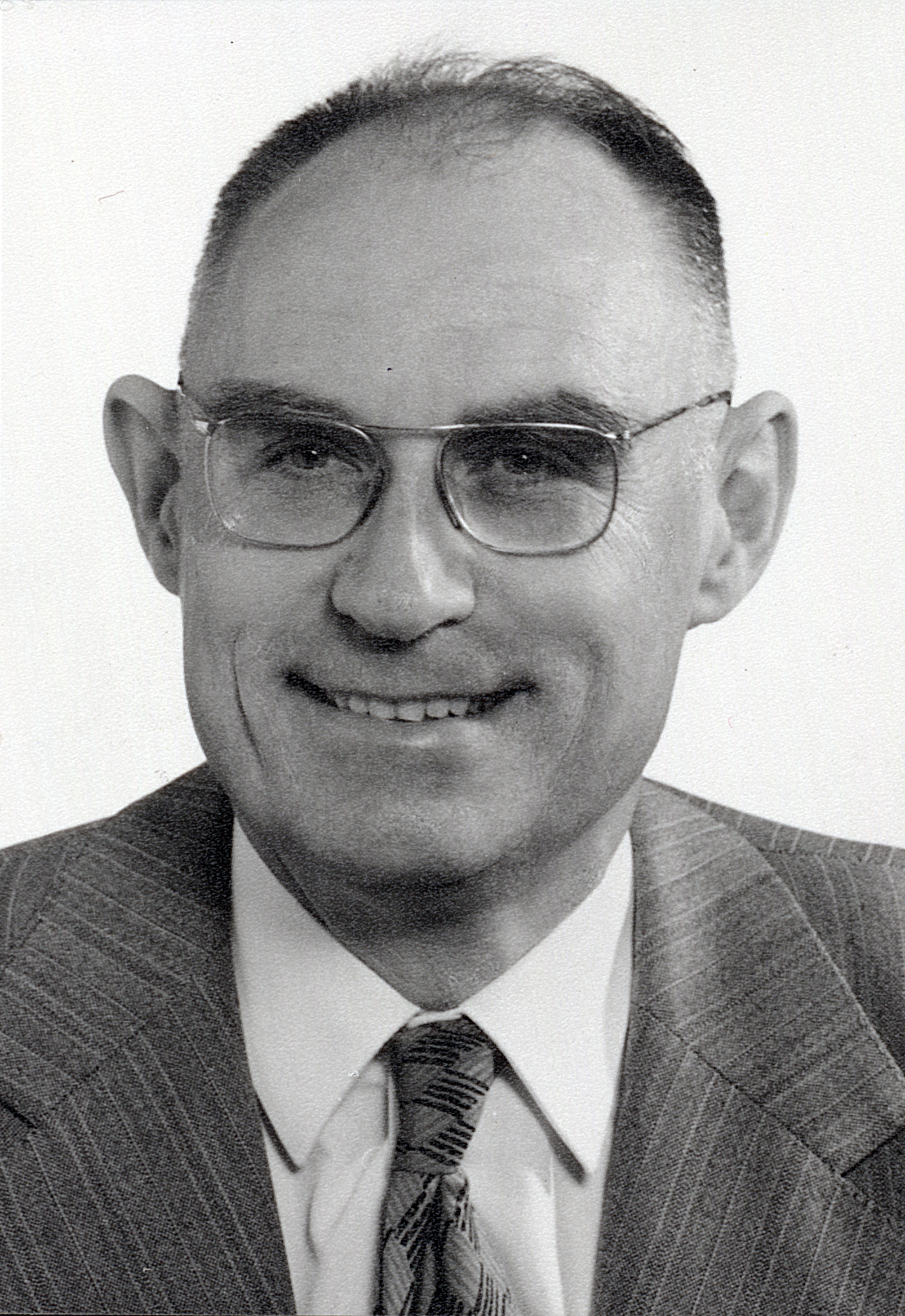
- Peter Henrici in 1982
- Born: 13 September 1923; Basel, Switzerland
- Died: 13 March 1987 (aged 63); Zürich, Switzerland
- Education: ETH Zürich
- Known for: Numerical analysis
- Scientific career
- Fields: Mathematics
- Workplaces: University of California, Los Angeles; ETH Zürich; University of North Carolina at Chapel Hill
- Doctoral advisor: Eduard Stiefel
- Doctoral students: Gilbert Strang, William B. Gragg

Peter Karl Henrici (13 September 1923 – 13 March 1987) was a Swiss mathematician best known for his contributions to the field of numerical analysis.

== Life ==
Henrici was born in Basel and studied law for two years at University of Basel. After World War II he transferred to ETH Zürich where he received a diploma in electrical engineering (1948) and a doctorate in mathematics with Eduard Stiefel as his advisor (1952).

=== Moving to the USA ===
In 1951 he moved to the United States and worked on a joint contract with American University and the National Bureau of Standards. Then, from 1956 to 1962, he taught at University of California, Los Angeles where he became a professor. In 1962 he returned to ETH Zürich as a professor, a position he kept for the rest of his life, though he also held a part-time appointment as William R. Kenan, Jr. Distinguished Professor of Mathematics at the University of North Carolina at Chapel Hill from 1985.

=== Numerical analyst ===
Henrici was an internationally recognized numerical analyst who published 11 books and more than 80 research papers within his field. Henrici was also a gifted pianist and a highly regarded teacher. He was an editor of a number of scientific journals, including Numerische Mathematik and Zeitschrift für Angewandte Mathematik und Physik. In 1962, he was a speaker at the International Congress of Mathematicians, and in 1978 he gave the SIAM John von Neumann Lecture.

== Peter Henrici Prize ==
Every four years since 1999, the Peter Henrici Prize is awarded by ETH Zürich and SIAM for "original contributions to applied analysis and numerical analysis and/or for exposition appropriate for applied mathematics and scientific computing".

== Publications ==
- Henrici, Peter (1962). Discrete variable methods in ordinary differential equations. Wiley.
- Henrici, Peter (1963). Error propagation for difference methods. SIAM series in applied mathematics. Wiley.
- Henrici, Peter (1964). Elements of numerical analysis. Wiley.
- Henrici, Peter (1974). Applied and computational complex analysis, Volume 1: Power series—integration—conformal mapping—location of zeros. Wiley. ISBN 0-471-37244-7.
- Henrici, Peter (1977). Applied and computational complex analysis, Volume 2: Special functions—integral transforms—asymptotics—continued fractions. Wiley. ISBN 0-471-01525-3.
- Henrici, Peter (1977). Computational Analysis with the HP-25 Pocket Calculator. Wiley. ISBN 0-471-02938-6.
- Henrici, Peter (1986). Applied and computational complex analysis, Volume 3: Discrete Fourier analysis—Cauchy integrals—construction of conformal maps—univalent functions. Wiley. ISBN 0-471-08703-3.
