= Beatrice Pelloni =

Italian mathematician

Beatrice Pelloni is an Italian mathematician specialising in applied mathematical analysis and partial differential equations. She is a professor of mathematics at Heriot-Watt University in Edinburgh, the former editor-in-chief of the Proceedings of the Royal Society of Edinburgh, Section A: Mathematics, and the former chair of the SIAM Activity Group on Nonlinear Waves and Coherent Structures.

== Education and career ==
Pelloni was born on 28 June 1962 in Rome. After earning a laurea from Sapienza University of Rome in 1985, she entered graduate study at Yale University, but had to take several periods of time off from the program to raise three children. She completed her Ph.D. at Yale in 1996. Her dissertation, Spectral Methods for the Numerical Solution of Nonlinear Dispersive Wave Equations, was supervised by Peter Jones.

While still a graduate student, Pelloni also worked as a researcher for the Institute of Applied Computational Mathematics of the Foundation for Research & Technology – Hellas (IACM-FORTH). After completing her doctorate she was a research associate at Imperial College London and then joined the University of Reading as a lecturer in 2001. At Reading she became a professor in 2012. She moved to Heriot-Watt University in 2016.

She is the president of the Edinburgh Mathematical Society for the 2025–2027 term.

== Recognition ==
Pelloni was the Olga Taussky-Todd Prize Lecturer at the 2011 International Congress on Industrial and Applied Mathematics, speaking on "Boundary value problems and integrability", and the 2019 Mary Cartwright Lecturer of the London Mathematical Society, speaking on "Nonlinear transforms in the study of fluid dynamics". She was elected Fellow of the IMA in 2012, and Fellow of the Royal Society of Edinburgh in 2020.
