= Weinan E =

Chinese mathematician

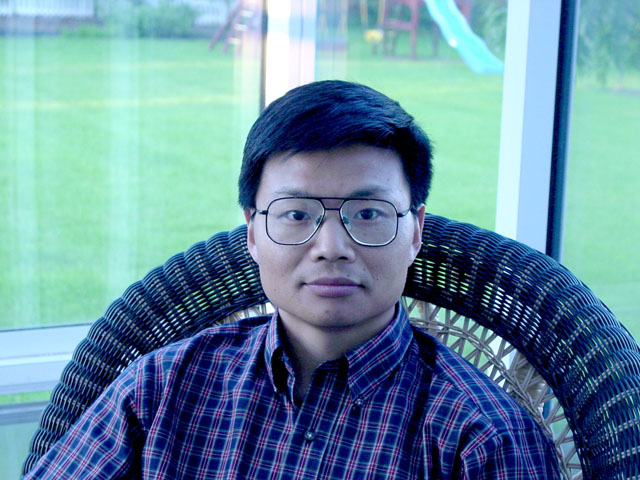
- Weinan E in 2003
- Born: September 1963 (age 62); Jingjiang, Jiangsu, China
- Education: University of California, Los Angeles; Chinese Academy of Sciences; University of Science and Technology of China
- Scientific career
- Fields: Applied mathematics
- Workplaces: Princeton University; Peking University
- Doctoral advisor: Björn Engquist

Weinan E (Chinese: 鄂维南; pinyin: È Wéinán; born September 1963) is a Chinese mathematician. He is known for his pathbreaking work in applied mathematics and machine learning. His academic contributions include novel mathematical and computational results in stochastic differential equations; design of efficient algorithms to compute multiscale and multiphysics problems, particularly those arising in fluid dynamics and chemistry; and pioneering work on the application of deep learning techniques to scientific computing. In addition, he has worked on multiscale modeling and the study of rare events.

He has also made contributions to homogenization theory, theoretical models of turbulence, stochastic partial differential equations, electronic structure analysis, multiscale methods, computational fluid dynamics, and weak KAM theory. He is currently a professor in the Department of Mathematics and Program in Applied and Computational Mathematics at Princeton University, and the Center for Machine Learning Research and the School of Mathematical Sciences at Peking University. Since 2015, he has been the inaugural director of the Beijing Institute of Big Data Research. He was an invited Plenary Speaker of the International Congress of Mathematicians 2022.

== Biography ==
E Weinan was born in Jingjiang, China. He completed his undergraduate studies in the Department of Mathematics at University of Science and Technology of China in 1982, and his master's degree in Academy of Mathematics and Systems Science at Chinese Academy of Sciences in 1985. He obtained his Ph.D. degree under the advice of Björn Engquist in the Department of Mathematics at University of California, Los Angeles in 1989. He then became a visiting member in Courant Institute, New York University from 1989 to 1991, and a member in Institute for Advanced Study from 1991 to 1992. After spending two more years as a long term member in Institute for Advanced Study, he joined Courant Institute, New York University as an associate professor in 1994, and became a full professor in 1997. Since 1999, he has been holding a professorship in the Department of Mathematics and Program in Applied and Computational Mathematics at Princeton University. He currently holds a professorship at the Center for Machine Learning Research and the School of Mathematical Sciences at Peking University.

He has made contributions to homogenization theory, theoretical models of turbulence, stochastic partial differential equations, electronic structure analysis, multiscale methods, computational fluid dynamics, and weak KAM theory. In the study of rare events, he and collaborators have developed the string method and transition path theory. In multiscale modeling, he and collaborators have developed the heterogeneous multiscale methods (HMM). He has also made significant contributions to the mathematical understanding of the microscopic foundation to the macroscopic theories for solids.

== Entrepreneurship ==
He is a cofounder of Moqi Inc in Beijing, which has developed and provided fingerprint recognition AI technology for the Ministry of Public Security of the People's Republic of China.

He is a major stakeholder of Beijing based big data analysis company PrinceTechs and the director of a project of Program 973, a basic research program initiated by the People's Republic of China to achieve technology and strategic edge in various scientific fields and especially the development of the rare earth minerals industry.

== Awards ==
He received Presidential Early Career Award in Science and Engineering in 1996, and Feng Kang Prize in Scientific Computing in 1999. He was the recipient of ICIAM Collatz Prize at the 5th International Congress of Industrial & Applied Math for his work on industrial and applied mathematics, the Ralph E. Kleinman Prize in 2009, and the Theodore von Kármán Prize in 2014. He was elected as a fellow of Institute of Physics in 2005, a fellow of SIAM in 2009, a member of the Chinese Academy of Sciences in 2011, and a fellow of the American Mathematical Society in 2012. He was invited to speak at the International Congress of Mathematicians (2002), and at Annual Meeting of the American Mathematical Society (2003). In 2019 E became a recipient of the Peter Henrici Prize. He is an invited Plenary Speaker of International Congress of Mathematicians 2022 in St. Petersburg. He will receive the ICIAM Maxwell Prize 2023 at the 9th International Congress for Industrial and Applied Mathematics for "his seminal contributions to applied mathematics and in particular on analysis and application of machine learning algorithms, multi-scale modeling, the modeling of rare events and stochastic partial differential equations".

== Selected publications ==
Weinan E, Weiqing Ren, and Eric Vanden-Eijnden. "String method for the study of rare events." Physical Review B 66, no. 5 (2002).

Weinan E, and Bjorn Engquist. "The heterogeneous multiscale methods." Communications in Mathematical Sciences 1, no. 1 (2003): 87-132.

Weinan E, Principles of multiscale modeling. Cambridge University Press, 2011.

Weinan E, "A Proposal on Machine Learning via Dynamical Systems", Comm. Math. Stat., vol.5, no.1., pp.1–11, 2017.

Linfeng Zhang, Han Wang, Jiequn Han, Roberto Car, Weinan E, "Deep Potential Molecular Dynamics: a scalable model with the accuracy of quantum mechanics", Physical Review Letters 120(10), 143001 (2018).

Jiequn Han, Arnulf Jentzen, Weinan E, "Solving high-dimensional partial differential equations using deep learning", Proceedings of the National Academy of Sciences, 115(34), 8505–8510 (2018).
