= Giulia Di Nunno =

Italian mathematician (born 1973)

Giulia Di Nunno (born 1973) is an Italian mathematician specializing in stochastic analysis and financial mathematics who works as a professor of mathematics at the University of Oslo, with an adjunct appointment at the Norwegian School of Economics.

As well as for her research, Di Nunno is known for promoting mathematics in Africa.

== Education and career ==
Di Nunno earned a degree in mathematics from the University of Milan in 1998, including research on stochastic functions with Yurii Rozanov. She moved to the University of Pavia for doctoral studies, continuing with Rozanov as an informal mentor but under the official supervision of Eugenio Regazzini. She completed her Ph.D. in 2003; her dissertation was On stochastic differentiation with applications to minimal variance hedging.

She joined the University of Oslo in 2003, and added her affiliation with the Norwegian School of Economics in 2009.

== Activism ==
Di Nunno is the chair of the European Mathematical Society's Committee for Developing Countries, and has worked to promote young researchers to visit Africa and to establish "Emerging Regional Centres of Excellence" there. The International Council for Industrial and Applied Mathematics gave her their 2019 Su Buchin Prize for this work, citing her "long-lasting record actively and efficiently encouraging top-level mathematical research and education in developing African countries".

== Books ==
With Bernt Karsten Øksendal and Frank Proske, Di Nunno is a co-author of the book Malliavin calculus for Lévy processes with applications to finance (Springer, 2009). She also co-edited Advanced Mathematical Methods for Finance (Springer, 1011) with Øksendal.
