= William B. Gragg =

- Born: 2 November 1936; Bakersfield, California
- Died: 25 December 2016 (aged 80); Monterey, California
- Education: UCLA
- Known for: Gragg Extrapolation
- Scientific career
- Fields: Mathematics
- Workplaces: Naval Postgraduate School
- Thesis: Repeated extrapolation to the limit in the numerical solution of ordinary differential equations (1964)
- Doctoral advisor: Peter Henrici

William B. Gragg (2 November 1936 – 25 December 2016) ended his career as an emeritus professor in the department of applied mathematics at the Naval Postgraduate School. He has made fundamental contributions in numerical analysis, particularly the areas of numerical linear algebra and numerical methods for ordinary differential equations.

He received his PhD at UCLA in 1964 under the direction of Peter Henrici. His dissertation work resulted in the Gragg Extrapolation method for the numerical solution of ordinary differential equations (sometimes also called the Bulirsch–Stoer algorithm).

Gragg is also well known for his work on the QR algorithm for unitary Hessenberg matrices, on updating the QR factorization, superfast solution of Toeplitz systems, parallel algorithms for solving eigenvalue problems, as well as his exposition on the Pade table and its relation to a large number of algorithms in numerical analysis.
