= Sara Zahedi =

Iranian-Swedish mathematician

Sara Zahedi (born 1981 in Tehran) is an Iranian-Swedish mathematician who works in computational fluid dynamics and holds a professorship in numerical analysis at the Royal Institute of Technology (KTH) in Sweden. She is one of ten winners and the only female winner of the European Mathematical Society Prize for 2016 "for her outstanding research regarding the development and analysis of numerical algorithms for partial differential equations with a focus on applications to problems with dynamically changing geometry". The topic of Zahedi's EMS Prize lecture was her recent research on the CutFEM method of solving fluid dynamics problems with changing boundary geometry, such as arise when simulating the dynamics of systems of two immiscible liquids. This method combines level set methods to represent the domain boundaries as cuts through an underlying uniform grid, together with numerical simulation techniques that can adapt to the complex geometries of grid cells cut by these boundaries.

When Zahedi was ten years old, with her father having been killed by the regime after the Iranian Revolution, her mother sent her on her own as a refugee to Sweden, and only rejoined her some years later. She was drawn to mathematics in part because she understood mathematics better than the Swedish language, and to fluid mechanics because of its real-world applications. She earned a master's degree from KTH in 2006, and a doctorate in 2011; her dissertation, Numerical Methods for Fluid Interface Problems, was supervised by Gunilla Kreiss. After postdoctoral studies at Uppsala University, she returned to KTH as an assistant professor in 2014.

== Selected publications ==
- Olsson, Elin; Kreiss, Gunilla; Zahedi, Sara (2007), "A conservative level set method for two phase flow. II", Journal of Computational Physics, 225 (1): 785–807, Bibcode:2007JCoPh.225..785O, doi:10.1016/j.jcp.2006.12.027, MR 2346700.
- Hansbo, Peter; Larson, Mats G.; Zahedi, Sara (2014), "A cut finite element method for a Stokes interface problem", Applied Numerical Mathematics, 85: 90–114, arXiv:1205.5684, Bibcode:2014ApNM...85...90H, doi:10.1016/j.apnum.2014.06.009, MR 3239219, S2CID 119167194.
