= Gilbert Strang =

American mathematician (born 1934)

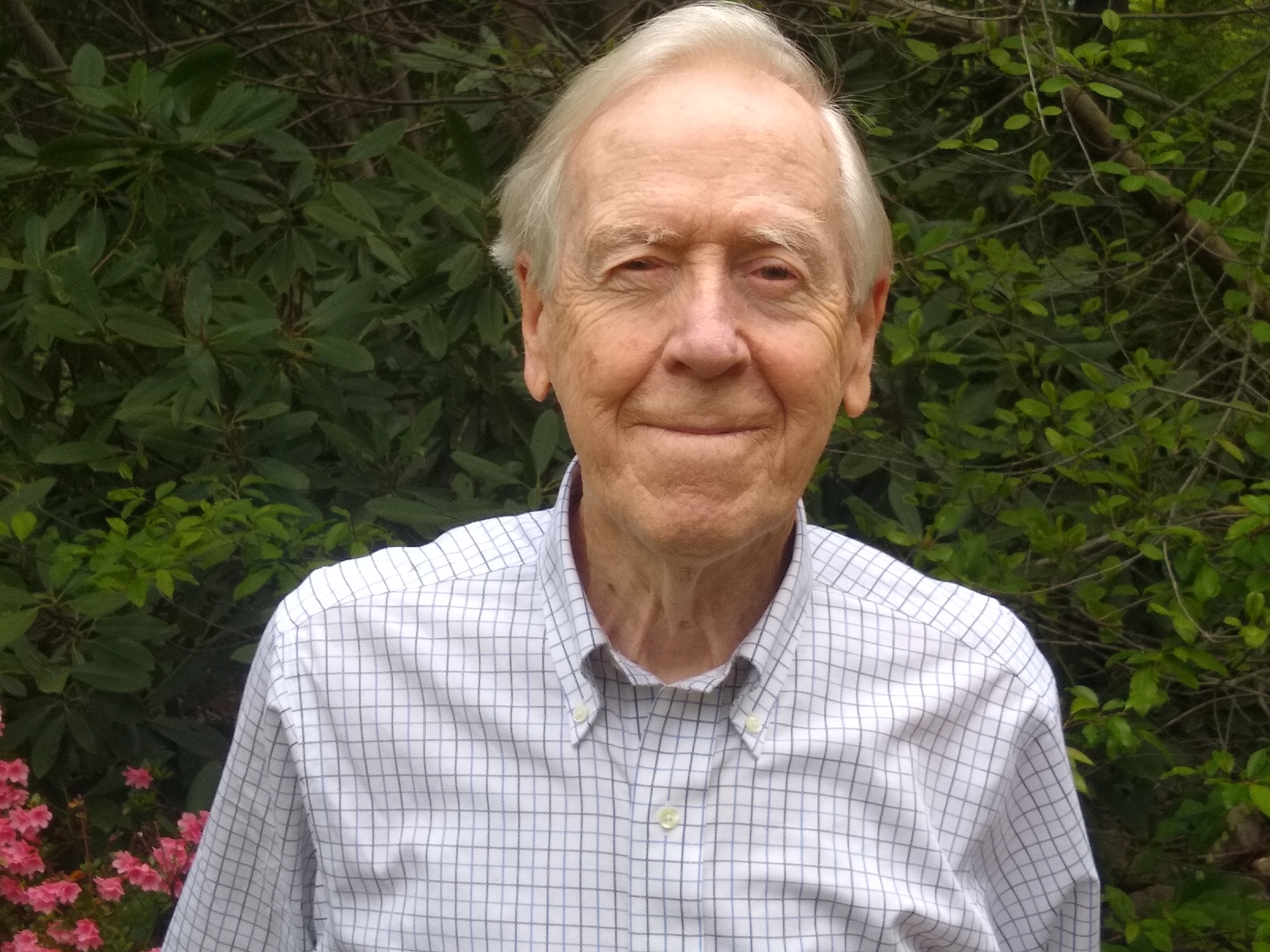
- Strang in 2021
- Born: November 27, 1934 (age 91); Chicago, Illinois, U.S.
- Education: Massachusetts Institute of Technology (BS); Balliol College, Oxford (BA, MA); University of California, Los Angeles (PhD)
- Awards: Chauvenet Prize (1977)
- Scientific career
- Fields: Mathematics
- Workplaces: Massachusetts Institute of Technology
- Thesis: Difference Methods for Mixed Boundary Value Problems (1959)
- Doctoral advisor: Peter K. Henrici
- Doctoral students: Alan Berger; Hermann Flaschka; Pavel Grinfeld; Edward Packel

William Gilbert "Gil" Strang (born November 27, 1934) is a Scottish-born American mathematician known for his contributions to finite element theory, the calculus of variations, wavelet analysis and linear algebra. He has made many contributions to mathematics education, including publishing mathematics textbooks. Strang was the MathWorks Professor of Mathematics at the Massachusetts Institute of Technology. He taught Linear Algebra, Computational Science and Engineering, and Learning from Data. His lectures are freely available on MIT OpenCourseWare.

Strang popularized the designation of the Fundamental Theorem of Linear Algebra as such.

== Biography ==
Gilbert Strang was born in Chicago in 1934. His parents William and Mary Catherine Strang migrated to the USA from Scotland. He and his sister Vivian grew up in Washington DC and Cincinnati, and went to high school at Principia in St. Louis.

Strang graduated from MIT in 1955 with a Bachelor of Science in mathematics. He then received a Rhodes Scholarship to the University of Oxford, where he received his B.A. and M.A. from Balliol College in 1957.

Strang earned his Ph.D. from UCLA in 1959 as a National Science Foundation Fellow, under the supervision of Peter K. Henrici. His dissertation was titled "Difference Methods for Mixed Boundary Value Problems".

While at Oxford, Strang met his future wife Jillian Shannon, and they married in 1958. Following his Ph.D. at UCLA, they have lived in Wellesley, Massachusetts for almost all of his 62 years on the MIT faculty. The Strangs have three sons David, John, and Robert. They describe themselves as a very close-knit family. He retired on May 15, 2023 after giving his final linear algebra lecture at MIT.

Strang's teaching has focused on linear algebra which has helped the subject become essential for students of many majors. His video lectures are popular on YouTube and MIT OpenCourseWare. Strang founded Wellesley-Cambridge Press to publish Introduction to Linear Algebra (now in 6th edition) and ten other books.

Professor Strang's video lectures at MIT are open to everyone. They are watched worldwide (more than 20 million viewers). They include 3 popular courses and the final lecture in 2023.

Math 18.06 (Linear Algebra) & Math 18.06SC (with several problems solved by TAs)

Math 18.065 (Linear Algebra and Learning from Data) leading to deep learning and basic AI

Math 18.085 (Computational Science and Engineering)

== University positions ==
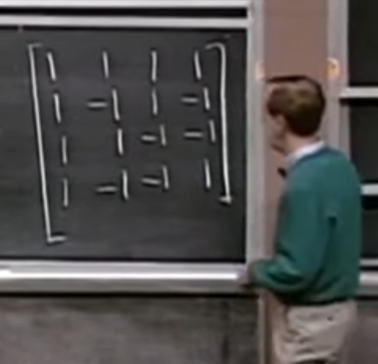
Strang demonstrates the Hadamard conjecture at MIT, 2005

- PhD student, UCLA (1957–1959)
- C. L. E. Moore instructor, MIT (1959–1961)
- NATO Postdoctoral Fellow, Oxford University (1961–1962)
- Mathematics faculty, MIT (1962–2023, as a full professor from 1970)

He has received honorary titles and fellowships from the following institutes:

- Alfred P. Sloan Fellow (1966–1967)
- Honorary Professor, Xi'an Jiaotong University, China (1980)
- Honorary Fellow, Balliol College, Oxford University (1999)
- Honorary Member, Irish Mathematical Society (2002)
- Fellow of the Society for Industrial and Applied Mathematics (2009)
- Doctor Honoris Causa, University of Toulouse (2010)
- Fellow of the American Mathematical Society (2012)
- Doctor Honoris Causa, Aalborg University (2013)

== Awards ==
- Rhodes Scholar (1955)
- National Science Foundation Graduate Research Fellowship (1957)
- Chauvenet Prize, Mathematical Association of America (1977)
- American Academy of Arts and Sciences (1985)
- Award for Distinguished Service to the Profession, Society for Industrial and Applied Mathematics (2003)
- Lester R. Ford Award (2005)
- Von Neumann Medal, US Association for Computational Mechanics (2005)
- Deborah and Franklin Haimo Award for Distinguished College or University Teaching of Mathematics (2007)
- Su Buchin Prize, International Congress (ICIAM, 2007)
- Henrici Prize (2007)
- National Academy of Sciences (2009)
- Irwin Sizer Award for the Most Significant Improvement to MIT Education (2020)

== Service ==
- President, Society for Industrial and Applied Mathematics (1999, 2000)
- Chair, U.S. National Committee on Mathematics (2003–2004)
- Chair, National Science Foundation (NSF) Advisory Panel on Mathematics
- Board Member, International Council for Industrial and Applied Mathematics (ICIAM)
- Abel Prize Committee (2003–2005)

== Publications ==
=== Books and monographs ===
1. Introduction to Linear Algebra, Sixth Edition, Wellesley-Cambridge Press (2023) (ISBN 978-1-7331466-7-8)
2. Linear Algebra for Everyone (2020)(ISBN 978-1-7331466-3-0)
3. Linear Algebra and Learning from Data (2019)(ISBN 978-0-692-19638-0,ISBN 978-1-7331466-2-3)
4. Calculus (2017) Textbook | Calculus Online Textbook | Supplemental Resources
5. Introduction to Linear Algebra, Fifth Edition (2016)
6. Differential Equations and Linear Algebra (2014)
7. Essays in Linear Algebra (2012)
8. Algorithms for Global Positioning, with Kai Borre (2012)
9. An Analysis of the Finite Element Method, with George Fix (2008)
10. Computational Science and Engineering (2007)
11. Linear Algebra and Its Applications, Fourth Edition (2005)
12. Linear Algebra, Geodesy, and GPS, with Kai Borre (1997)
13. Wavelets and Filter Banks, with Truong Nguyen (1996)
14. Strang, Gilbert (1986). Introduction to Applied Mathematics. Wellesley, MA: Wellesley-Cambridge Press. pp. xii+758. MR 0870634.

== See also ==
- The Joint spectral radius, introduced by Strang and Rota in the early 60s.
- Strang splitting
