= IMA Journal of Numerical Analysis =

- Discipline: Numerical analysis, applied mathematics
- Language: English
- Edited by: C.M. Elliott, A. Ern, A. Iserles, E. Süli

Publication details
- Former names: Journal of the Institute of Mathematics and Its Applications
- History: 1981–present
- Publisher: Oxford University Press
- Frequency: Quarterly
- Open access: Hybrid
- Impact factor: 2.275 (2019)

Standard abbreviations
- ISO 4: IMA J. Numer. Anal.

Indexing
- ISSN: 0272-4979 (print); 1464-3642 (web)
- LCCN: 81643470
- OCLC no.: 978886789

Links
- Journal homepage; Online archive

The IMA Journal of Numerical Analysis is a quarterly peer-reviewed scientific journal published by Oxford University Press on behalf of the Institute of Mathematics and its Applications. It was established in 1981 and covers all aspects of numerical analysis, including theory, development or use of practical algorithms, and interactions between these aspects. The editors-in-chief are C.M. Elliott (University of Warwick), A. Ern (CERMICS, Ecole des Ponts (ENPC)), A. Iserles (University of Cambridge), and E. Süli (University of Oxford).

== Abstracting and indexing ==
The journal is abstracted and indexed in:

- Current Contents/Physical, Chemical and Earth Sciences
- EBSCO databases
- MathSciNet
- ProQuest databases
- Science Citation Index Expanded
- Scopus
- Zentralblatt Math

According to the Journal Citation Reports, the journal has a 2025 impact factor of 2.3.
