= BIT Numerical Mathematics =

- Discipline: Numerical analysis
- Language: English
- Edited by: Gunilla Kreiss

Publication details
- History: 1961–present
- Publisher: Springer Science+Business Media
- Frequency: Quarterly
- Impact factor: 1.663 (2020)

Standard abbreviations
- ISO 4: BIT Numer. Math.
- MathSciNet: BIT

Indexing
- ISSN: 0006-3835 (print); 1572-9125 (web)
- LCCN: sn95029245
- OCLC no.: 51522871

Links
- Journal homepage; Journal page at publisher's website; Online access

BIT Numerical Mathematics is a quarterly peer-reviewed mathematics journal that covers research in numerical analysis. It was established in 1961 by Carl Erik Fröberg and is published by Springer Science+Business Media. The name "BIT" is a reverse acronym of Tidskrift för Informationsbehandling (Swedish: Journal of Information Processing).

Previous editors-in-chief have been Carl Erik Fröberg (1961–1992), Åke Björck (1993–2002), Axel Ruhe (2003–2015), and Lars Eldén (2016). As of 2021, the editor-in-chief is Gunilla Kreiss.

Peter Naur served as a member of the editorial board between the years 1960 and 1993, and Germund Dahlquist between 1962 and 1991.

== Abstracting and indexing ==
The journal is abstracted and indexed in:

- Science Citation Index
- Scopus
- Zentralblatt Math
- EBSCO databases
- Academic OneFile
- ACM Digital Library
- Computer Abstracts International Database
- Computer Science Index
- Current Contents/Physical, Chemical and Earth Sciences
- Current Index to Statistics
- International Bibliography of Book Reviews
- International Bibliography of Periodical Literature
- Mathematical Reviews
- PASCAL

According to the Journal Citation Reports, the journal has a 2020 impact factor of 1.663.
