= Ricerche di Matematica =

- Discipline: Pure and applied mathematics
- Language: English
- Edited by: Salvatore Rionero

Publication details
- History: 1952–present
- Publisher: Springer-Verlag Italia S.r.l., Milano
- Frequency: Biannual
- Impact factor: 1.2 (2022)

Standard abbreviations
- ISO 4: Ric. Mat.

Indexing
- ISSN: 0035-5038 (print); 1827-3491 (web)
- LCCN: 2019204734
- OCLC no.: 1640734

Links
- Journal homepage

Ricerche di Matematica is a peer-reviewed mathematics journal on applied mathematics and pure mathematics. It was established in 1952 by Carlo Miranda with the collaboration of Renato Caccioppoli and other members of the Istituto di Matematica of the University of Naples Federico II. From 1952 to 2005 the journal was published in 54 volumes in Naples with articles in Italian, English, or French. From 2006 "Ricerche di Matematica" (with articles only in English) is published by Springer-Verlag under the auspices of the Dipartimento di Matematica e Applicazioni "Renato Caccioppoli"; a board of professors in this department at the University of Naples Federico II appoints and supports the journal's editors. The journal is indexed by Mathematical Reviews and Zentralblatt MATH.
