= Björn Engquist =

Swedish mathematician (born 1945)

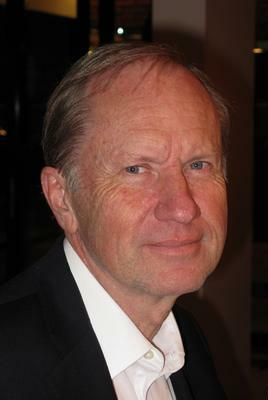
- Born: 2 June 1945 (age 81); Stockholm, Sweden
- Education: University of Uppsala
- Known for: Engquist–Majda absorbing boundary condition; Essentially non-oscillatory schemes; Multiscale modeling
- Awards: George David Birkhoff Prize (2012)
- Scientific career
- Fields: Applied mathematics
- Workplaces: University of California, Los Angeles; Princeton University; University of Texas at Austin
- Doctoral advisor: Heinz-Otto Kreiss
- Doctoral students: Weinan E; Thomas Hou; Gunilla Kreiss; Anna-Karin Tornberg

Björn Engquist (also known as Bjorn Engquist; born 2 June 1945 in Stockholm) is a Swedish mathematician, who is a professor at the Department of Computational and Applied Mathematics at University of Texas at Austin. He has been a leading contributor in the areas of multiscale modeling and scientific computing, and a productive educator of applied mathematicians.

== Life ==
He received his PhD in numerical analysis from University of Uppsala in 1975, and taught there during the following years while also holding a professorship at the University of California, Los Angeles. In 2001, he moved to Princeton University as the Michael Henry Stater University Professor of Mathematics and served as the director of the Program in Applied and Computational Mathematics. He has also been professor at the Royal Institute of Technology in Stockholm since 1993, and is director of the Parallel and Scientific Computing Institute. Engquist currently holds the Computational and Applied Mathematics Chair I at the Institute for Computational Engineering and Sciences at the University of Texas at Austin, after leaving Princeton in 2005.

== Research ==
His research field is computational and applied mathematics and numerical methods for differential equations with applications to multi-scale modeling, electromagnetism, and fluid mechanics. Engquist has authored more than 100 scientific publications and advised 31 PhD students.

== Awards ==
He is a recipient of numerous distinctions and awards: a member of the American Academy of Arts & Sciences, a member of the Royal Swedish Academy of Sciences and the Royal Swedish Academy of Engineering Sciences, and an invited speaker at the International Congress of Mathematicians (1982 and 1998), European Congress of Mathematics (1992), and European Congress of Fluid Mechanics (1991). He received the first SIAM James H. Wilkinson Prize in Numerical Analysis and Scientific Computing (1982), Peter Henrici Prize (2011), and George David Birkhoff Prize (2012). He was selected to the Norwegian Academy of Science and Letters in 2011.
