= Fadil Santosa =

American mathematician

Fadil Santosa is a professor of applied mathematics and statistics at Johns Hopkins University, where he is currently the Yu Wu and Chaomei Chen Department Head. Before, he was a professor at the University of Minnesota.

At the University of Minnesota he was director of the Minnesota Center for Industrial Mathematics, and later director of the Institute for Mathematics and its Applications (IMA) from 2008 to 2017.

Santosa is a Fellow of the American Mathematical Society and the Society for Industrial and Applied Mathematics (SIAM).

Santosa has been recognized with the 2023 SIAM Prize for Distinguished Service to the Profession. He also received the 2023 Johns Hopkins Diversity Award.

Santosa is known for his work in applied mathematics (detailed below) and his efforts to connect academia and industry, which, in addition to the leadership roles mentioned earlier, include co-authoring a guide for mathematicians on finding careers in business, industry, and government.

Santosa holds two patents: for multifocal optical device design and for symbol-based decoding of optical codes.

== Research ==
Santosa's research interests include inverse problems, wave phenomena in complex media, photonic devices, and optimal design. His research includes foundational work on using L^{1} optimization to find sparse solutions to inverse problems, with a 1986 paper now seen as a precursor to methods like compressed sensing and LASSO.

Santosa was also one of the first to apply the level-set method to structural optimization and inverse scattering problems.

His PhD advisor was Robert W. Carroll. Santosa was born in Bandung, Indonesia.

== Selected publications ==
Books

- BIG Jobs Guide: Business, Industry, and Government Careers for Mathematical Scientists, Statisticians, and Operations Researchers (2018), with Rachel Levy and Richard Laugesen.
- The Princeton Companion to Applied Mathematics (2015), co-edited with Nicholas J. Higham, Mark R. Dennis, Paul Glendinning, Paul A. Martin, and Jared Tanner.
- Analysis of Least-Squares Velocity Inversion (1989), with William W. Symes and Raymon L. Brown.

Journal articles

- Li, Yuying; Santosa, Fadil (1996). "A computational algorithm for minimizing total variation in image restoration". IEEE Transactions on Image Processing. 5 (6): 987–995.
- Santosa, Fadil; Symes, William W. (1986). "Linear inversion of band-limited reflection seismograms". SIAM Journal on Scientific and Statistical Computing. 7 (4): 1307–1330. doi:10.1137/0907087.
- Osher, Stanley J.; Santosa, Fadil (2001). "Level set methods for optimization problems involving geometry and constraints: I. Frequencies of a two-density inhomogeneous drum". Journal of Computational Physics. 171 (1): 272–288.
- Rondi, Luca; Santosa, Fadil (2001). "Enhanced electrical impedance tomography via the Mumford–Shah functional". ESAIM: Control, Optimisation and Calculus of Variations. 6: 517–538. doi:10.1051/cocv:2001121.
