= Calculus of moving surfaces =

Extension of the classical tensor calculus

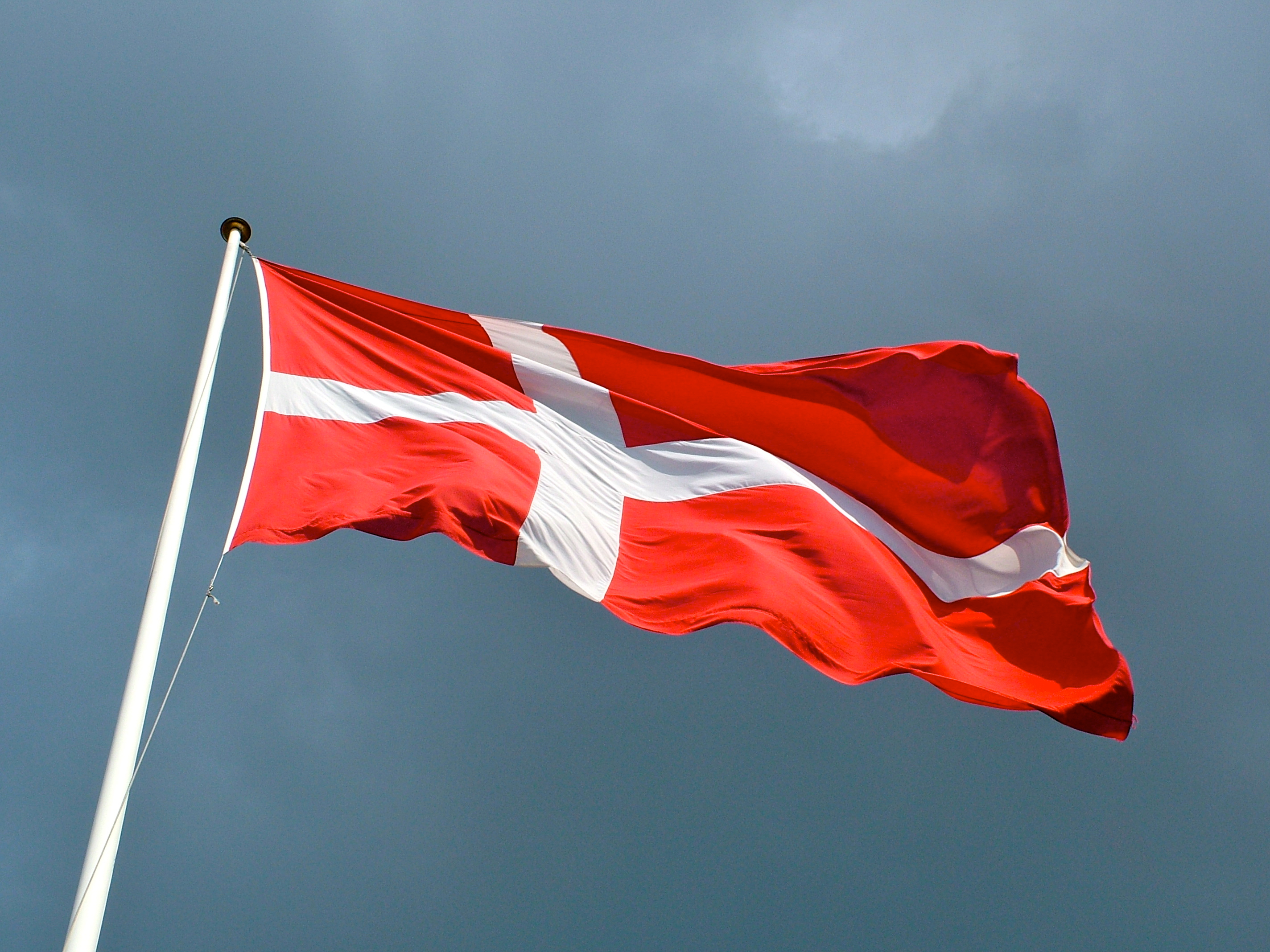
The surface of a flag in the wind is an example of a deforming manifold.

The calculus of moving surfaces (CMS) is an extension of the classical tensor calculus to deforming manifolds. Central to the CMS is the tensorial time derivative $\dot{\nabla}$ whose original definition was put forth by Jacques Hadamard. It plays the role analogous to that of the covariant derivative $\nabla _{\alpha }$ on differential manifolds in that it produces a tensor when applied to a tensor.

Suppose that $\Sigma_t$ is the evolution of the surface $\Sigma$ indexed by a time-like parameter $t$. The definitions of the surface velocity $C$ and the operator $\dot{\nabla}$ are the geometric foundations of the CMS. The velocity C is the rate of deformation of the surface $\Sigma$ in the instantaneous normal direction. The value of $C$ at a point $P$ is defined as the limit

$$C=\lim_{h\to 0} \frac{\text{Distance}(P,P^*)}{h}$$

where $P^{*}$ is the point on $\Sigma_{t+h}$ that lies on the straight line perpendicular to $\Sigma_{t}$ at point P. This definition is illustrated in the first geometric figure below. The velocity $C$ is a signed quantity: it is positive when $\overline{PP^{*}}$ points in the direction of the chosen normal, and negative otherwise. The relationship between $\Sigma_{t}$ and $C$ is analogous to the relationship between location and velocity in elementary calculus: knowing either quantity allows one to construct the other by differentiation or integration.

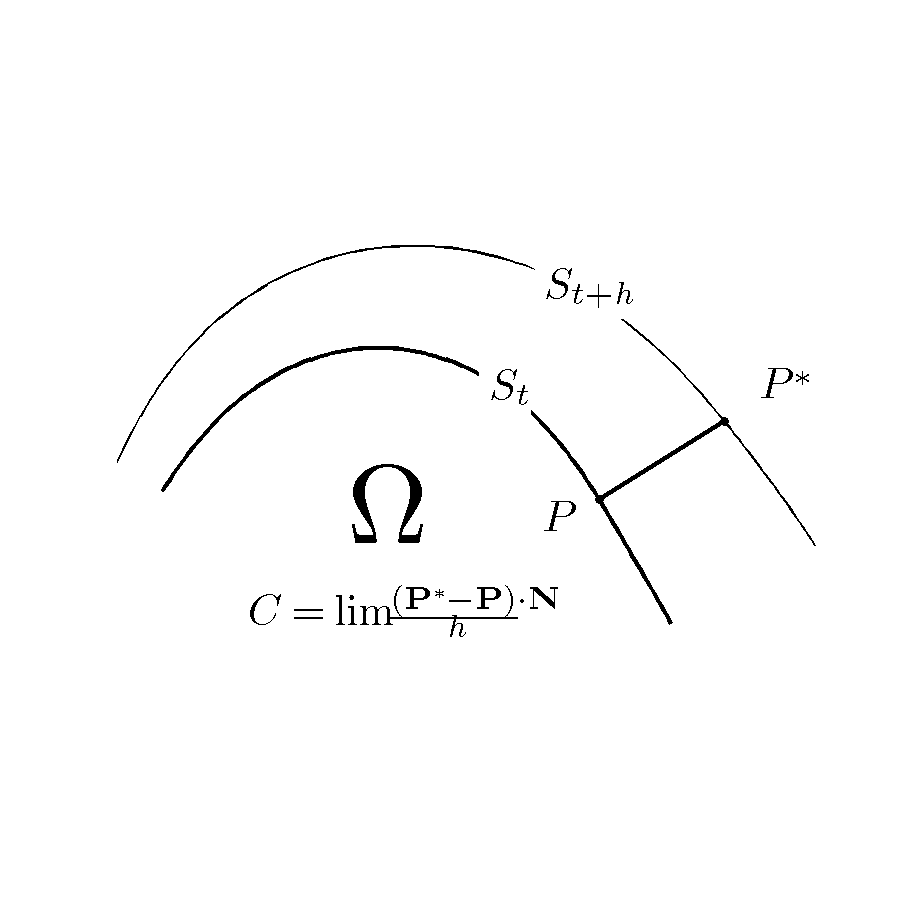
Geometric construction of the surface velocity C

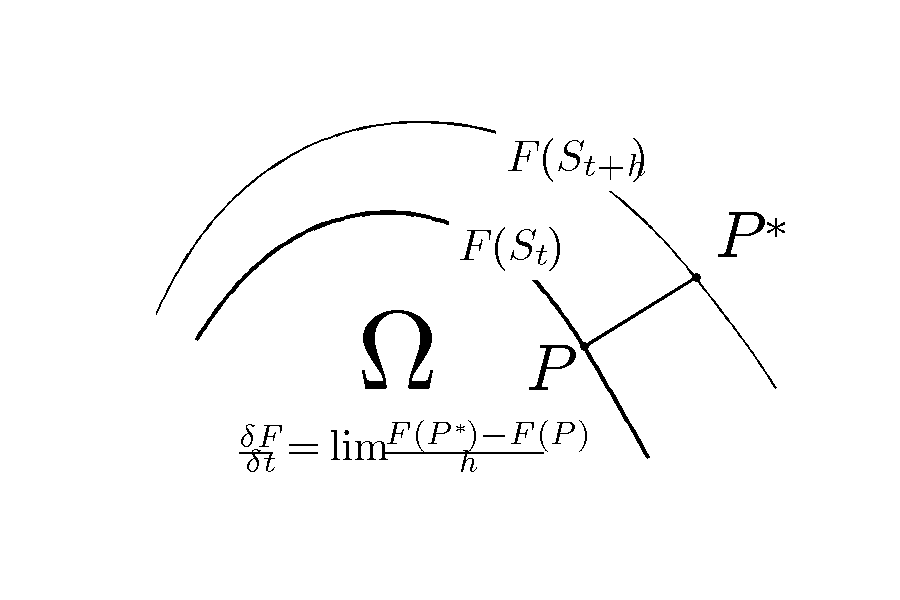
Geometric construction of the $\delta/\delta t$-derivative of an invariant field F

The tensorial time derivative $\dot{\nabla}$ for a scalar field F defined on $\Sigma_{t}$ is the rate of change in $F$ in the instantaneously normal direction:

$$\frac{\delta F}{\delta t}=\lim_{h\to 0} \frac{F(P^*)-F(P)}{h}$$

This definition is also illustrated in second geometric figure.

The above definitions are geometric. In analytical settings, direct application of these definitions may not be possible. The CMS gives analytical definitions of C and $\dot{\nabla}$ in terms of elementary operations from calculus and differential geometry.

== Analytical definitions ==
For analytical definitions of $C$ and $\dot{\nabla}$, consider the evolution of $S$ given by

$$Z^i = Z^i \left( t ,S \right)$$

where $Z^{i}$ are general curvilinear space coordinates and $S^{\alpha }$ are the surface coordinates. By convention, tensor indices of function arguments are dropped. Thus the above equations contains $S$ rather than $S^\alpha$. The velocity object $\textbf{V}=V^i\textbf{Z}_i$ is defined as the partial derivative

$$V^i =\frac{\partial Z^i \left( t ,S \right)}{\partial t }$$

The velocity $C$ can be computed most directly by the formula

$$C=V^i N_i$$

where $N_i$ are the covariant components of the normal vector $\vec{N}$.

Also, defining the shift tensor representation of the surface's tangent space $Z^{\alpha}_{i}=\textbf{S}^\alpha\cdot\textbf{Z}_i$ and the tangent velocity as $V^\alpha=Z^\alpha_iV^i$ , then the definition of the $\dot{\nabla}$ derivative for an invariant F reads

$$\dot{\nabla}F=\frac{\partial F\left( t ,S \right)}{\partial t }-V^\alpha\nabla _{\alpha }F$$

where $\nabla_\alpha$ is the covariant derivative on S.

For tensors, an appropriate generalization is needed. The proper definition for a representative tensor $T^{i\alpha }_{j\beta }$ reads

$$\dot{\nabla}T^{i\alpha }_{j\beta }=\frac{\partial T^{i\alpha }_{j\beta }}{\partial t}-V^{\eta }\nabla _{\eta }T^{i\alpha }_{j\beta }+V^{m}\Gamma ^{i}_{mk}T^{k\alpha }_{j\beta }-V^{m}\Gamma ^{k}_{mj}T^{i\alpha }_{k\beta }+\dot{\Gamma}^\alpha_\eta T^{i\eta }_{j\beta }-\dot{\Gamma}^\eta_\beta T^{i\alpha }_{j\eta }$$

where $\Gamma^k_{mj}$ are Christoffel symbols and $\dot{\Gamma}^\alpha_\beta=\nabla_\beta V^\alpha-C B^\alpha_\beta$ is the surface's appropriate temporal symbols ($B^\alpha_\beta$ is a matrix representation of the surface's curvature shape operator)

== Properties of the $\dot{\nabla}$-derivative ==
The $\dot{\nabla}$-derivative commutes with contraction, satisfies the product rule for any collection of indices

$$\dot{\nabla}(S^i_\alpha T^\beta_j
)=T^\beta_j\dot{\nabla}S^i_\alpha + S^i_\alpha\dot{\nabla}T^\beta_j$$

and obeys a chain rule for surface restrictions of spatial tensors:

$$\dot{\nabla}F^j_k(Z,t) =\frac{\partial F^j_k}{\partial t}+CN^i \nabla _i F^j_k$$

Chain rule shows that the $\dot{\nabla}$-derivatives of spatial "metrics" vanishes

$$\dot{\nabla}\delta^i_j=0,\dot{\nabla}Z_{ij}=0,\dot{\nabla}Z^{ij}=0,\dot{\nabla}\varepsilon _{ijk}=0,\dot{\nabla}\varepsilon^{ijk}=0$$

where $Z_{ij}$ and $Z^{ij}$ are covariant and contravariant metric tensors, $\delta ^{i}_{j}$ is the Kronecker delta symbol, and $\varepsilon _{ijk}$ and $\varepsilon ^{ijk}$ are the Levi-Civita symbols. The main article on Levi-Civita symbols describes them for Cartesian coordinate systems. The preceding rule is valid in general coordinates, where the definition of the Levi-Civita symbols must include the square root of the determinant of the covariant metric tensor $Z_{ij}$.

== Differentiation table for the $\dot{\nabla}$-derivative ==
The $\dot{\nabla}$ derivative of the key surface objects leads to highly concise and attractive formulas. When applied to the covariant surface metric tensor $S_{\alpha \beta }$ and the contravariant metric tensor $S^{\alpha \beta }$, the following identities result

$$\begin{align}
\dot{\nabla}S_{\alpha \beta } &=0 \\[8pt]
\dot{\nabla}S^{\alpha \beta } &=0
\end{align}$$

where $B_{\alpha \beta }$ and $B^{\alpha \beta }$ are the doubly covariant and doubly contravariant curvature tensors. These curvature tensors, as well as for the mixed curvature tensor $B^\alpha_\beta$, satisfy

$$\begin{align}
\dot{\nabla}B_{\alpha \beta }& = \nabla_\alpha \nabla_\beta C + CB_{\alpha \gamma }B^\gamma_\beta \\[8pt]
\dot{\nabla}B^\alpha_\beta& = \nabla_\beta\nabla^\alpha C + CB^\alpha_\gamma B^\gamma_\beta \\[8pt]
\dot{\nabla}B^{\alpha \beta }& = \nabla ^\alpha \nabla^\beta C + CB^{\gamma \alpha}B^\beta_\gamma
\end{align}$$

The shift tensor $Z^i_\alpha$ and the normal $N^i$ satisfy

$$\begin{align}
\dot{\nabla}Z^i_\alpha & = N^i\nabla _\alpha C \\[8pt]
\dot{\nabla}N^i & = -Z^i_\alpha \nabla^\alpha C
\end{align}$$

Finally, the surface Levi-Civita symbols $\varepsilon _{\alpha \beta }$ and $\varepsilon ^{\alpha \beta }$ satisfy

$$\begin{align}
\dot{\nabla} \varepsilon _{\alpha \beta } & = 0 \\[8pt]
\dot{\nabla} \varepsilon ^{\alpha \beta } & = 0
\end{align}$$

== Time differentiation of integrals ==
The CMS provides rules for time differentiation of volume and surface integrals.

== See also ==
- ADM formalism
