= International Congress on Industrial and Applied Mathematics =

The International Congress on Industrial and Applied Mathematics (ICIAM) is an international congress in the field of applied mathematics held every four years under the auspices of the International Council for Industrial and Applied Mathematics. The initial proposal for this conference series was made by Gene Golub.

== List of congresses ==
- ICIAM 1987 – (France) Paris
- ICIAM 1991 – (United States) Washington, D.C.
- ICIAM 1995 – (Germany) Hamburg
- ICIAM 1999 – (United Kingdom) Edinburgh
- ICIAM 2003 – (Australia) Sydney
- ICIAM 2007 – (Switzerland) Zurich
- ICIAM 2011 – (Canada) Vancouver
- ICIAM 2015 – (China) Beijing
- ICIAM 2019 – (Spain) Valencia
- ICIAM 2023 – (Japan) Tokyo

== See also ==
- Society for Industrial and Applied Mathematics
- International Congress of Mathematics
