= Zatorski =

Zatorski (feminine: Zatorska; plural: Zatorscy) is a Polish surname. Notable people with the surname include:

- Ewelina Zatorska, Polish mathematician
- Izabela Zatorska (born 1962), Polish long-distance runner
- Paweł Zatorski (born 1990), Polish volleyball player

== See also ==
- Zagórski
