= Teckentrup =

Teckentrup is a surname. Notable people with the surname include:

- Aretha Teckentrup (fl. from 2005), UK-based mathematician
- Britta Teckentrup (born 1969), German artist, author, and book illustrator
- Ralf Teckentrup (born 1957), German aviation executive
