= Needell =

Needell is a surname. Notable people with the surname include:

- Deanna Needell (fl. 2009), American applied mathematician
- Mary Anna Needell (1830–1922), English novelist
- Tiff Needell (born 1951), British racing driver and television presenter
