= Wim Sweldens =

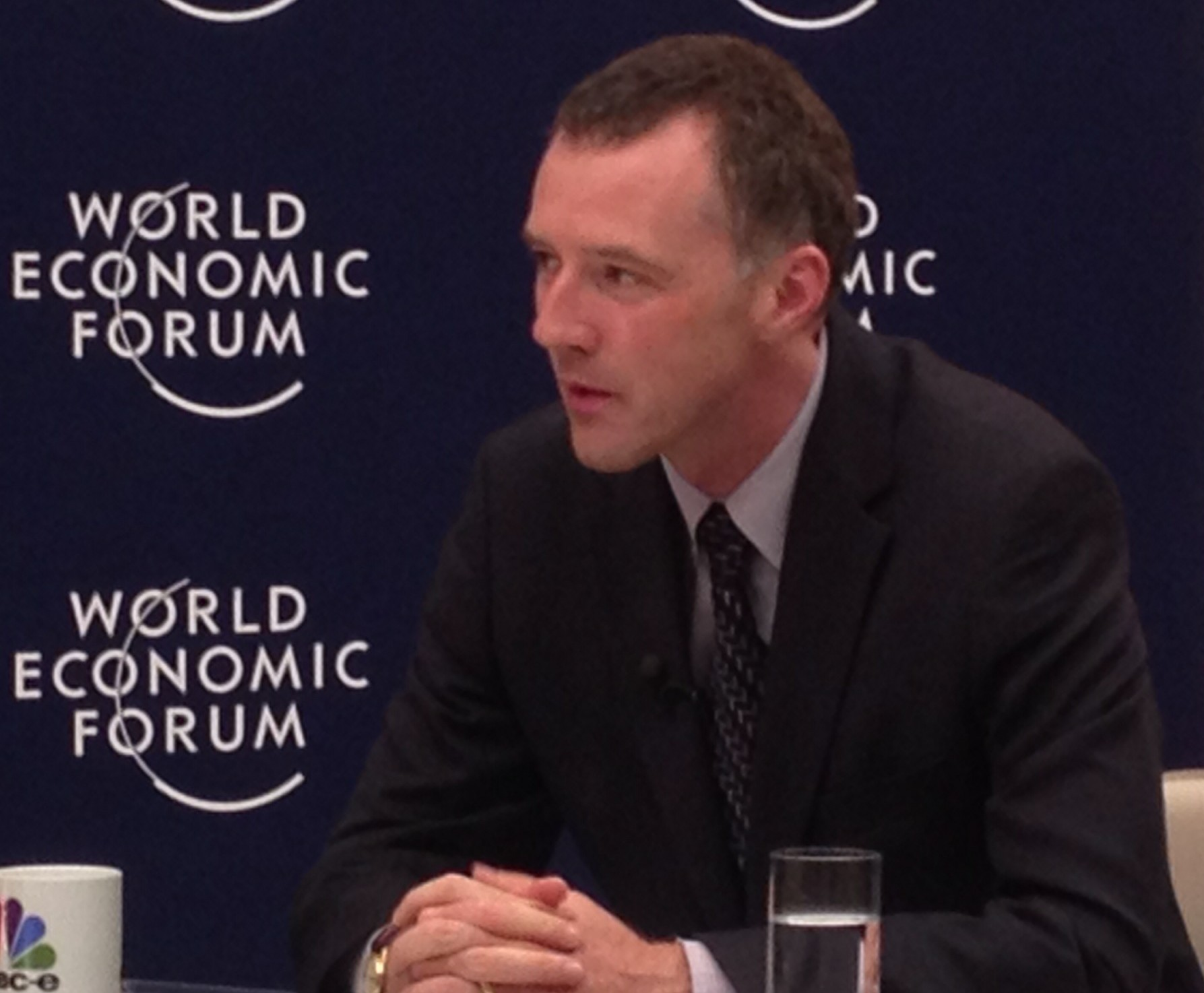
- Sweldens speaking at the World Economic Forum in 2012
- Education: KU Leuven, Belgium
- Occupations: Scientist, technology innovator, business executive
- Employer: Kiswe
- Known for: Wavelets, mobile networks, data compression, interactive streaming, Artificial Intelligence Quotient (AIQ)

Wim Sweldens is a Belgian American business leader, scientist, and inventor known for innovations in communications, signal processing, and streaming technology. He invented the wavelet lifting scheme, used in the JPEG 2000 image compression standard. He led development of the lightRadio cell tower technology at Alcatel-Lucent. Sweldens is the co-founder of Kiswe Mobile. He received the Leslie Fox Prize for Numerical Analysis in 1997 and was including in the MIT TR35 list in 1999. He is an Honorary Professor at KU Leuven.

== Education ==
He attended Aangenomen College in Sint-Truiden for secondary education. Sweldens completed bachelor’s and master’s degrees in engineering and computer science at KU Leuven in 1990 and a PhD in computer science and applied mathematics at KU Leuven in 1994.

== Career ==
Sweldens worked as a postdoctoral researcher and lecturer at the University of South Carolina from 1994 to 1995. He invented the wavelet lifting scheme in 1995, an algorithm used both in the JPEG 2000 image compression standard, as well as for compressing 3D polygonal meshes.

He worked at Bell Labs from 1995 to 2009 and later served as President of Alcatel-Lucent’s Wireless Division from 2009 to 2012. At Alcatel-Lucent, he led development of a cell tower technology called lightRadio, which reduced the size of transmission equipment. The equipment could be placed indoors and linked to optical fiber, cables saving mobile network power usage.

In 2013 Sweldens co-founded Kiswe Mobile with Jeong Kim and Jimmy Lynn. Kiswe developed interactive livestreaming technology for live events, including multiview streams and audience interaction features. The company worked with Big Hit Entertainment on BTS online events and produced the virtual Tour of Flanders during the 2020 COVID-19 lockdowns.

Sweldens holds 28 US patents. He was entrepreneur in residence at Columbia University from 2013 to 2017. He is a fellow of the IEEE, member of the Royal Belgian Academy of Sciences, and a member of the International Academy of Television Arts and Sciences (Emmys). He is an Honorary Professor at the University of Leuven.

In 2025, Sweldens introduced the concept of AIQ (Artificial Intelligence Quotient) in his substack. AIQ measure how well humans can work with AI agents and navigate the so-called “jagged edge” of agent capabilities.

== Awards and honours ==
- Leslie Fox Prize for Numerical Analysis (1997).
- MIT TR35 (1999).
- KU Leuven Honorary Professor (2015).
- Global Telecoms Business "Power 100” list (2009).
