= Rindler =

Rindler is a surname. Notable people with the surname include:

- Filip Rindler (born 1984), Austrian mathematician
- Jürgen Rindler (born 1986), Austrian footballer
- Wolfgang Rindler (1924–2019), Austrian physicist

== See also ==
- Rindler Creek, stream in California
- Rindler coordinates
