= Dawid Kielak =

Polish mathematician

- Education: University of Oxford
- Known for: pure mathematics, geometric group theory
- Awards: Whitehead Prize (2022); Frontiers of Science Award (2023)
- Scientific career
- Fields: Mathematics
- Workplaces: University of Oxford
- Doctoral advisor: Martin Bridson

Dawid Kielak (Polish: [ˈdavid ˈkjɛlak]) is a Polish mathematician and Professor of Pure Mathematics at the Mathematical Institute of the University of Oxford as well as a Tutorial Fellow of Hertford College. His research interests include geometric group theory and the theory of group rings.

== Life and career ==
He completed his undergraduate degree in St. Peter's College and his PhD degree in Magdalen College, Oxford. He subsequently continued his career in Warsaw (2012), Bonn (2012–2015), and Bielefeld (2015–2020) before returning to Oxford where he joined the university's Mathematical Institute.

He is a member of the London Mathematical Society and the European Mathematical Society.

He is known for formulating a mathematical theorem allowing for the recognition of spaces, which after minor modifications, behave like spacetime in Einstein's theory of relativity.

In 2022, he was awarded the Whitehead Prize of the London Mathematical Society for "his striking, original and fundamental contributions to the fields of geometric group theory and low-dimensional topology, and in particular for his work on automorphism groups of discrete groups and fibrings of manifolds and groups".

In 2023, he became the co-recipient of the Frontiers of Science Award together with Marek Kaluba (Karlsruhe Institute of Technology) and Piotr W. Nowak (Polish Academy of Sciences) for their research in the field of algebraic and geometric topology. The award was presented at the inaugural International Congress of Basic Science (ICBS) in Beijing.

In September 2023 Kielak was awarded a Title of Distinction of Professor of Pure Mathematics by the University of Oxford.

In 2026, Kielak delivered an invited section lecture at the International Congress of Mathematicians in Philadelphia.

== Selected publications ==
- Marek Kaluba, Dawid Kielak, and Piotr W. Nowak. On property (T) for Aut(F_{n}) and SL_{n}(Z). Annals of Mathematics 193(2), 539-562 (2021).
- Dawid Kielak. The Bieri–Neumann–Strebel invariants via Newton polytopes. Invent. Math. 219, 1009–1068 (2020).
- Dawid Kielak. Residually finite rationally solvable groups and virtual fibring. J. Amer. Math. Soc. 33, 451-486 (2020).
- Barbara Baumeister, Dawid Kielak, and Emilio Pierro. On the smallest non-abelian quotient of Aut(F_{n}). Proceedings of the London Mathematical Society 118(6), 1547-1591 (2019).

== See also ==
- List of Polish mathematicians
