= Eric de Sturler =

Dutch-American applied mathematician (b.1966)

Eric de Sturler (born 15 January 1966, Groningen) is a Professor of Mathematics at Virginia Tech in Blacksburg, Virginia. He is on the editorial board of Applied Numerical Mathematics and the Open Applied Mathematics Journal.

Prof. de Sturler completed his Ph.D. under the direction of Henk van der Vorst at Technische Universiteit Delft in 1994. His thesis is entitled Iterative Methods on Distributive Memory Computers. He was a second-place winner of the Leslie Fox Prize for Numerical Analysis in 1997. His research focuses on preconditioned iterative methods for solving linear and nonlinear systems, with applications in computational physics, material science, and mathematical biology.
