= Leslie Fox Prize for Numerical Analysis =

British award in mathematics

The Leslie Fox Prize for Numerical Analysis of the Institute of Mathematics and its Applications (IMA) is a biennial prize established in 1985 by the IMA in honour of mathematician Leslie Fox (1918-1992). The prize honours "young numerical analysts worldwide" (any person who is less than 31 years old), and applicants submit papers for review. A committee reviews the papers, invites shortlisted candidates to give lectures at the Leslie Fox Prize meeting, and then awards First Prize and Second Prizes based on "mathematical and algorithmic brilliance in tandem with presentational skills."

== Prize winners list ==
Source: Institute of Mathematics and its Applications

- 1985 - Lloyd N. Trefethen (inaugural prize winner)
- 1986 - J. W. Demmel and N. I. M. Gould
- 1988 - Nicholas J. Higham
- 1989 - 3 first prizes: Martin Buhmann ("Multivariable cardinal interpolation with radial basis functions"), Bart De Moor ("The restrictricted singular value decomposition: properties and applications"), Andrew M. Stuart ("Linear instability implies spurious periodic solutions")
- 1991 - Christopher Budd and J. F. B. M. Kraaijevanger
- 1993 - Yuying Li
- 1995 - Adrian Hill
- 1997 - Wim Sweldens, ("The Lifting Scheme: A Construction of Second Generation Wavelets")
- 1999 - Niles Pierce and Reha Tütüncü
- 2001 - Anna-Karin Tornberg
- 2003 - Jared Tanner
- 2005 - Roland Opfer and Paul Tupper
- 2007 - Yoichiro Mori and Ioana Dumitriu
- 2009 - Brian Sutton
- 2011 - Yuji Nakatsukasa
- 2013 - Michael Neilan
- 2015 - Iain Smears and Alex Townsend
- 2017 - Nicole Spillane
- 2019 - Yunan Yang
- 2021 - Lindon Roberts
- 2023 - Alice Cortinovis and Melanie Weber
- 2025 - James Foster and Tizian Wenzel

== Second Prize awardees ==
Source: Institute of Mathematics and its Applications

- 1985 - Nicholas Higham (Manchester), S.P.J. Matthews (Dundee), P.K. Sweby (Reading), Y. Yuan (Cambridge)
- 1986 - J.L. Barlow (Penn State), J. Scott (Oxford), A.J. Wathen (Bristol)
- 1988 - T. Hagstrom (SUNY, Stony Brook), P.T. Harker (Univ of Pennsylvania), I.R.H. Jackson (Cambridge), T. Tang (Leeds)
- 1989 - M. Ainsworth (Durham), R.H. Chan (Hong Kong), Alan Edelman (MIT), Desmond Higham (Toronto)
- 1991 - J. Levesley (Coventry), P.D. Loach (Bristol), B.F. Smith (Argonne), H. Zha (Stanford)
- 1993 - A. Edelman (Berkeley), D.J. Higham (Dundee), Z. Jia (Bielefeld), P. Lin (Oxford), R. Mathias (Minnesota)
- 1995 - X-W. Chang (McGill), L. Jay (Minnesota), Y. Liu (Cambridge), K-C. Toh (Cornell), D. Wang (Purdue)
- 1997 - T.A. Driscoll (Boulder), Valeria Simoncini (Pavia), Eric de Sturler (Zurich), R.H. Tütüncü (Carnegie-Mellon), Antonella Zanna (Cambridge), T. Zhang (Stanford)
- 1999 - Aurelian Bejancu (Cambridge), Vincent Heuveline (Heidelberg), Paul Houston (Oxford), Ross Lippert (Sandia National Laboratories)
- 2001 - Tilo Arens (Brunel University), Begona Cano (University of Valladolid), Eric Darve (Stanford University), Jing-Rebecca Li (Courant Institute NYU), Dominik Schötzau (University of Minnesota), Divakar Viswanath (University of Chicago)
- 2003 - Melvin Leok (California Institute of Technology), Adam Oberman (University of Texas), Marc Schweitzer (University of Bonn), Tatjana Stykel (University of Calgary), Boris Vexler (University of Heidelberg)
- 2005 - Lehel Banjai (MPI, Leipzig), Coralia Cartis (University of Oxford), Johan Hoffman (Chalmers University), Fabio Nobile (Politecnico di Milano), Adam Oberman (Simon Fraser University)
- 2007 - Timo Betcke (University of Manchester), Laurent Demanet (Stanford University), Daniel Kressner (University of Zagreb), Emre Mengi (UC San Diego), Sheehan Olver (University of Cambridge)
- 2009 - Stefano Giani (Nottingham University), Daan Huybrechs (Katholieke Universiteit Leuven), Armin Lechleiter (CMAPX, Polytechnique), Colin B. Macdonald (Mathematics, UCLA), Liuqiang Zhong (Xiangtan University)
- 2011 - Ben Adcock (Simon Fraser University), Arnulf Jentzen (Princeton University), Richard Norton (University of Oxford), Bart Vandereycken (ETH), Konstantinos Zygalakis (University of Oxford)
- 2013 - Ingrid von Glehn (University of Oxford), Georges Klein (University of Fribourg), Martin Takáč (University of Edinburgh), Alex Townsend (University of Oxford), Andre Uschmajew (Technische Universität Berlin).
- 2015 - Patrick Farrell (University of Oxford), Olivier Fercoq (Telecom ParisTech), John Pearson (University of Kent), Clarice Poon (Cambridge University)
- 2017 - Mario Berljafa (KU Leuven), Evan Gawlik (University of California, San Diego), Robert Gower (Ecole Normale Superieure), Lise-Marie Imbert-Gerard (New York University), Aretha Teckentrup (University of Edinburgh)
- 2019 - Alexander Bastounis (Cambridge University), Simone Brugiapaglia (Simon Fraser University), Daniel Fortunato (Harvard University), Abdul-Lateef Haji-Ali (Heriot-Watt University)
- 2021 - Nicolas Boulle (University of Oxford), Derek Driggs (University of Cambridge), Theo Mary (Sorbonne University), Barbara Verfurth (Karlsruhe Institute of Technology)
- 2023 - Matthew Colbrook (Cambridge), Matteo Croci (UT Austin), Ioannis Papadopoulos (Imperial College London), Shanyin Tong (Columbia University)
- 2025 - Sara Fraschini (Vienna), Georg Maierhofer (Cambridge), David Persson (NYU), Wenqi Zhu (Oxford)

== See also ==
- List of mathematics awards
