= Whitehead Prize =

London Mathematical Society prize

- Country: United Kingdom
- Presented by: London Mathematical Society (LMS)
- Eligibility: Normally resident in the UK or a member of the LMS mainly educated in the UK
- Established: 1979
- Website: www.lms.ac.uk/prizes/whitehead-prizes

The Whitehead Prize is awarded yearly by the London Mathematical Society to multiple mathematicians working in the United Kingdom who are at an early stage of their career. The prize is named in memory of homotopy theory pioneer J. H. C. Whitehead.

More specifically, people being considered for the award must be resident in the United Kingdom on 1 January of the award year or must have been educated in the United Kingdom. Also, the candidates must have less than 15 years of work at the postdoctorate level and must not have received any other prizes from the Society.

Since the inception of the prize, no more than two could be awarded per year, but in 1999 this was increased to four "to allow for the award of prizes across the whole of mathematics, including applied mathematics, mathematical physics, and mathematical aspects of computer science".

The Senior Whitehead Prize has similar residence requirements and rules concerning prior prizes, but is intended to recognize more experienced mathematicians.

== List of Whitehead Prize winners ==
- 1979 Peter Cameron, Peter Johnstone
- 1980 H. G. Dales, Toby Stafford
- 1981 Nigel Hitchin, Derek F. Holt
- 1982 John M. Ball, Martin J. Taylor
- 1983 Jeff Paris, Andrew Ranicki
- 1984 Simon Donaldson, Samuel James Patterson
- 1985 Dan Segal, Philip J. Rippon
- 1986 Terence Lyons, David A. Rand
- 1987 Caroline Series, Aidan H. Schofield
- 1988 S. M. Rees, P. J. Webb, Andrew Wiles
- 1989 D. E. Evans, Frances Kirwan, R. S. Ward
- 1990 Martin T. Barlow, Richard Taylor, Antony Wassermann
- 1991 Nicholas Manton, A. J. Scholl
- 1992 K. M. Ball, Richard Borcherds
- 1993 D. J. Benson, Peter B. Kronheimer, D. G. Vassiliev
- 1994 P. H. Kropholler, R. S. MacKay
- 1995 Timothy Gowers, Jeremy Rickard
- 1996 John Roe, Y. Safarov
- 1997 Brian Bowditch, A. Grigor'yan, Dominic Joyce
- 1998 S. J. Chapman, Igor Rivin, Jan Nekovář
- 1999 Martin Bridson, G. Friesecke, Nicholas Higham, Imre Leader
- 2000 M. A. J. Chaplain, Gwyneth Stallard, Andrew M. Stuart, Burt Totaro
- 2001 M. McQuillan, A. N. Skorobogatov, V. Smyshlyaev, J. R. King
- 2002 Kevin Buzzard, Alessio Corti, Marianna Csörnyei, C. Teleman
- 2003 N. Dorey, T. Hall, Marc Lackenby, M. Nazarov
- 2004 Mark Ainsworth, Vladimir Markovic, Richard Thomas, Ulrike Tillmann
- 2005 Ben Green, Bernd Kirchheim, Neil Strickland, Peter Topping
- 2006 Raphaël Rouquier, Jonathan Sherratt, Paul Sutcliffe, Agata Smoktunowicz
- 2007 Nikolay Nikolov, Oliver Riordan, Ivan Smith, Catharina Stroppel
- 2008 Timothy Browning, Tamás Hausel, Martin Hairer, Nina Snaith
- 2009 Mihalis Dafermos, Cornelia Druțu, Bethany Rose Marsh, Markus Owen
- 2010 Harald Helfgott, Jens Marklof,Lasse Rempe-Gillen Françoise Tisseur
- 2011 Jonathan Bennett Alexander Gorodnik, Barbara Niethammer,Alexander Pushnitski
- 2012 Toby Gee, Eugen Vărvărucă, Sarah Waters, Andreas Winter
- 2013 Luis Fernando Alday André Neves, Tom Sanders, Corinna Ulcigrai
- 2014 Clément Mouhot, Ruth Baker, Tom Coates, Daniela Kühn and Deryk Osthus
- 2015 Peter Keevash, James Maynard, Christoph Ortner, Mason Porter, Dominic Vella, David Loeffler and Sarah Zerbes
- 2016 A. Bayer, G. Holzegel, Jason P. Miller, Carola-Bibiane Schönlieb
- 2017 Julia Gog, Ashley Montanaro, Oscar Randal-Williams, Jack Thorne, Michael Wemyss
- 2018 Caucher Birkar, Ana Caraiani, Heather Harrington, Valerio Lucarini, Filip Rindler, Péter Varjú
- 2019 Alexandr Buryak, David Conlon, Toby Cubitt, Anders Hansen, William Parnell, Nick Sheridan
- 2020 Maria Bruna, Ben Davison, Adam Harper, Holly Krieger, Andrea Mondino, Henry Wilton
- 2021 Jonathan Evans, Patrick Farrell, Agelos Georgakopoulos, Michael Magee, Aretha Teckentrup, Stuart White
- 2022 Jessica Fintzen, Ian Griffiths, Dawid Kielak, Chunyi Li, Tadahiro Oh, Euan Spence
- 2023 David Bate, Soheyla Feyzbakhsh, András Juhász, Mahesh Kakde, Yankı Lekili, Marie-Therese Wolfram
- 2024 Sabine Bögli, Viveka Erlandsson, James Newton, Clarice Poon, Julian Sahasrabudhe, Alessandro Sisto
- 2025 Tom Hutchcroft, Richard Montgomery, Vidit Nanda, Evgeny Shinder, Perla Sousi, Ewelina Zatorska
- 2026 Costante Bellettini, Jeffrey Galkowski, Yuji Nakatsukasa, Rachel Newton, Mark Powell, Dhruv Ranganathan

== See also ==
- Fröhlich Prize
- Senior Whitehead Prize
- Shephard Prize
- Berwick Prize
- Naylor Prize and Lectureship
- Pólya Prize (LMS)
- De Morgan Medal
- List of mathematics awards
