= Li Yuying =

This could refer to

- Li Shizeng, born as Li Yuying
- Yuying Li, also spelled Li Yuying
