= Anders Hansen (disambiguation) =

Anders Hansen (born 1970) is a Danish golfer.

Anders Hansen may also refer to:

- Anders C. Hansen, Norwegian mathematician
- Anders Schmidt Hansen (born 1978), Danish golfer
