= Clarice Poon =

British applied mathematician

Clarice Poon is a British applied mathematician whose research lies "at the intersection of optimisation, imaging sciences, and machine learning", including research on compressed sensing and on instability in image reconstruction techniques that use deep learning. She is a reader (associate professor) in the Mathematics Institute of the University of Warwick.

== Education and career ==
After reading mathematics and computer science as an undergraduate student at the University of Oxford, Poon became a student of Anders C. Hansen at the University of Cambridge. She completed her Ph.D. in 2015 with the dissertation Recovery Guarantees for Generalized and Sub-Nyquist Sampling Methods.

She was a postdoctoral researcher at Paris Dauphine University and Cambridge, and a lecturer (assistant professor) at the University of Bath. She moved to the University of Warwick in 2019 as a reader.

== Recognition ==
Poon was a finalist for the 2015 Leslie Fox Prize for Numerical Analysis of the Institute of Mathematics and its Applications, receiving second prize.

She was a 2024 recipient of the Whitehead Prize of the London Mathematical Society, given "for her pioneering work at the intersection of optimisation, imaging sciences, and machine learning" including "groundbreaking contributions to the design and analysis of large-scale optimisation schemes aimed at solving ill-posed inverse problems and advancing supervised machine learning techniques".
