= Gwyneth Stallard =

Professor of pure mathematics

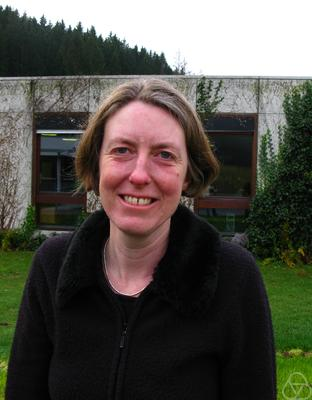
Stallard in 2009

Gwyneth Mary Stallard OBE is a British mathematician whose research concerns complex dynamics and the iteration of meromorphic functions. She is a professor of pure mathematics at the Open University.

== Education and career ==
Stallard read mathematics at King's College, Cambridge, finishing in 1985, and earned her Ph.D. from Imperial College London in 1991. Her dissertation, Some problems in the iteration of meromorphic functions, was supervised by Irvine Noel Baker. She has spoken about the difficulty of finding postdoctoral research positions at a time when there were few such positions in England and the ties of her husband's job prevented her from moving abroad; she maintained her mathematical career at this stage by taking a temporary lectureship teaching engineering students at the University of Southampton. When she became a professor of mathematics at the Open University, she became the first woman to be a professor in the department.

== Activism and recognition ==
Stallard won the Whitehead Prize in 2000, and describes this point as the moment when she became confident in her mathematical research abilities.

Stallard was the chair of the Women in Mathematics Committee of the London Mathematical Society from 2006 to 2015, and in 2015 she was named an Officer of the Order of the British Empire for her work in support of women in mathematics. In 2016 she was given a special award by the Suffrage Science Scheme on Ada Lovelace Day in recognition of her work in this area.

In 2016, the London Mathematical Society selected her as their Mary Cartwright Lecturer.
