= International Association for Mathematics and Computers in Simulation =

Organisation consisting of researchers in simulation

The International Association for Mathematics and Computers in Simulation (IMACS) has the goal to establish means of communication between researchers on simulation. It is incorporated in the United States and Belgium, with affiliates in other countries. IMACS organizes conferences, and publishes scientific journals and books in affiliation with commercial publishers.

== IMACS journals ==
- Applied Numerical Mathematics (Elsevier)
- Mathematics and Computers in Simulation (Elsevier)
- Journal of Theoretical and Computational Acoustics (World Scientific)
