= William Parnell (mathematician) =

British applied mathematician

William James Parnell
- Education: University of Bristol (BSc); University of Oxford (MSc)
- Spouse: Debbie
- Awards: Whitehead Prize
- Scientific career
- Fields: Elasticity (physics); Acoustics; Materials science; Continuum mechanics
- Workplaces: University of Manchester; Henry Royce Institute; Wave Motion (journal)
- Thesis: Homogenisation techniques for wave propagation in composite materials (2004)
- Doctoral advisor: David Abrahams
- Website: https://williamjparnell.weebly.com/

William James Parnell is a British mathematician and Professor of Applied Mathematics at the University of Manchester. He is also the Editor-in-Chief of the Wave Motion academic journal and a fellow of the Institute of Mathematics and its Applications.

== Education ==
Parnell studied mathematics at the University of Bristol, graduating with a First Class BSc in 1999. He then moved to the University of Oxford and graduated with a Masters in Mathematical Modelling and Scientific Computing in 2000. At the University of Manchester, he completed his PhD under the supervision of David Abrahams. His thesis, "Homogenisation techniques for wave propagation in composite materials", was published in 2004 and funded by Thales Underwater Systems.

After finishing his PhD in 2004, Parnell remained at the University of Manchester, becoming an EPSRC postdoctoral research fellow.

== Career ==
Drawing on Manchester's heritage in mathematical wave theory, Parnell launched the Mathematics of Waves and Materials (MWM) research group at the University of Manchester in 2010. This was alongside close colleague David Abrahams, who had previously been his PhD supervisor. He now leads the research group in partnership with Raphael Assier.

In 2017, Parnell took over from Andrew N. Norris to become Editor-in-Chief of Wave Motion, a scientific journal published by Elsevier. He had served on its editorial board since 2012.

In 2019, Parnell was awarded the Whitehead Prize by London Mathematical Society for his research contributions in the fields of acoustic and elastodynamic metamaterials, in addition to his collaboration and promotion of mathematics in industry. This included developing mathematical models of syntactic foams. In the same year, Parnell received a £897K extension from UKRI to his research fellowship, NEMESIS, a multidisciplinary project focusing on metamaterials. Two PhD students were funded by the University of Manchester and Dyson as part of this project. The programme also included public engagement activities such as talks and modelling workshops.

== Selected publications ==
- Tensile properties of all-polymeric syntactic foam composites: Experimental characterization and mathematical modelling
