= Rachel Ward (mathematician) =

American applied mathematician

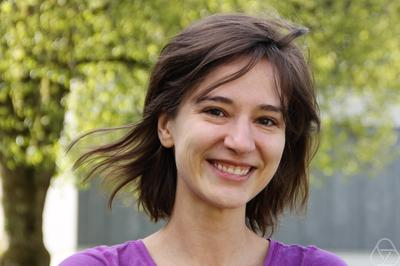
- Ward at Oberwolfach Research Institute for Mathematics in 2014
- Born: Rachel Angela Ward
- Education: University of Texas at Austin (BS); Princeton University (PhD)
- Scientific career
- Workplaces: University of Texas at Austin
- Thesis: Freedom through Imperfection: Exploiting the flexibility offered by redundancy in signal processing
- Academic advisors: Ingrid Daubechies

Rachel Angela Ward is an American applied mathematician at the University of Texas at Austin. She is known for work on machine learning, optimization, and signal processing. At the University of Texas, she is W. A. "Tex" Moncrief Distinguished Professor in Computational Engineering and Sciences—Data Science, and professor of mathematics.

== Education ==
Ward received her BS in mathematics from the University of Texas at Austin in 2005. She earned her PhD in applied and computational mathematics from Princeton University in 2009. Her doctoral advisor was Ingrid Daubechies.

== Career ==
Ward was an instructor at the Courant Institute from 2009-2011 and then joined the faculty at the University of Texas at Austin in 2011. In 2018, she was a Visiting Research Scientist at Facebook Artificial Intelligence Research and in 2019 she was a Von Neumann Fellow at the Institute for Advanced Study. She serves on the Scientific Advisory Board for the Institute for Computational and Experimental Research in Mathematics (ICERM).

== Research ==
Ward is known for her work across a wide variety of applied math areas including image processing, compressed sensing, and stochastic and adaptive gradient descent. Ward also worked on a project funded by the Department of Defense, with faculty from UT Austin's College of Natural Sciences and Cockrell School, to develop unmanned aerial vehicles.

== Awards and honors ==
Ward was awarded an Alfred P. Sloan Research Fellowship in Mathematics in 2012. Ward and Deanna Needell received the IMA Prize in Mathematics and Applications in 2016. In 2020, Ward was named as a Simons Fellow. Ward was an invited speaker at the 2022 International Congress of Mathematicians.
