= Jan D. Achenbach =

Dutch-American scientist in engineering (1935–2020)

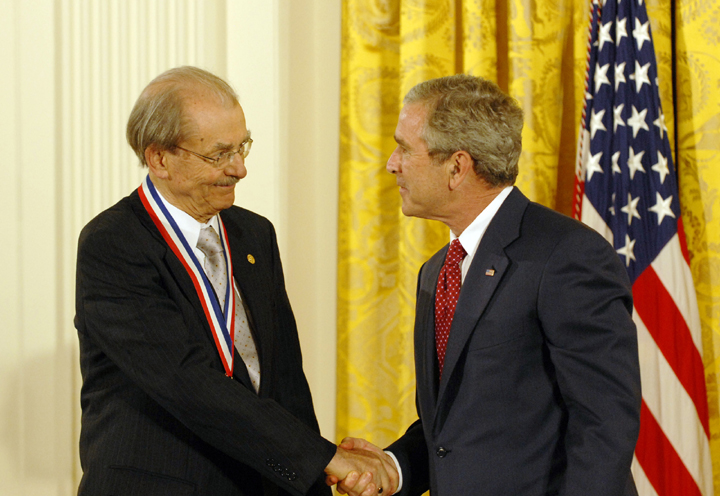
- Jan D. Achenbach receiving the 2005 National Medal of Science from president George W. Bush
- Born: 20 August 1935; Leeuwarden, Netherlands
- Died: 22 August 2020 (aged 85)
- Citizenship: U.S.
- Education: Delft University of Technology; Stanford University
- Known for: Wave Motion
- Awards: William Prager Medal (2001); National Medal of Technology; National Medal of Science; Theodore von Karman Medal (2010); ASME Medal (2012); Timoshenko Medal
- Scientific career
- Fields: Solid mechanics
- Workplaces: Columbia University; Northwestern University
- Doctoral advisor: Chi-Chang Chao

Jan Drewes Achenbach (20 August 1935 – 22 August 2020) was a Dutch-American engineer who was on the faculty of Northwestern University from 1963 until his retirement.

== Biography ==
Achenbach was born in Leeuwarden in the north of the Netherlands. He studied aeronautics at the Delft University of Technology, graduating with an M.Sc. in 1959. After this, he went to Stanford University, where he received his Ph.D. in 1962. After a year at Columbia University, he became an assistant professor at Northwestern University, where he spent over 50 years in the McCormick School of Engineering.

== Research ==
Achenbach has developed methods for flaw detection and characterization by using contact transducers, imaging techniques and laser-based ultrasonics. He has also developed methods for thin-layer characterization by acoustic microscopy. Work is both analytical and experimental in nature, with extensive cooperation with investigators from other universities and from industrial organizations on theoretical experimental projects. Work in fracture mechanics has been primarily on dynamic fracture. He also carried out research on structural acoustics and on the mechanical behavior of composite materials.

Achenbach was the founding editor-in-chief of Wave Motion from the journal's establishment in 1979 until 2012.

== Honors and awards ==
=== Awards ===
- 2012 – ASME Medal by the American Society of Mechanical Engineers
- 2010 – Theodore von Karman Medal by the American Society of Civil Engineers
- 2005 – National Medal of Science
- 2003 – National Medal of Technology
- 2001 – William Prager Medal by the Society of Engineering Science
- 1997 – Outstanding Service Award by the American Academy of Mechanics
- 1996 – McDonnell-Douglas Aerospace Model of Excellence Award by McDonnell-Douglas Aerospace
- 1992 – Timoshenko Medal by the American Society of Mechanical Engineers
- 1975 – Curtis W. McGraw Research Award by the American Society of Engineering Education

=== Memberships and fellowships ===
- Member of the National Academy of Sciences
- Member of the National Academy of Engineering
- Fellow of the American Academy of Arts and Sciences
- Honorary Member of the American Society of Mechanical Engineers
- Fellow of the American Association for the Advancement of Science (1994)
- Fellow of the Japan Society for the Promotion of Science
- Corresponding Member of the Royal Netherlands Academy of Arts and Sciences (1999)
- Fellow of the Acoustical Society of America
- Fellow of the American Academy of Mechanics

== Books ==
- Achenbach, J. D. (2003). Reciprocity in elastodynamics. Cambridge University Press. ISBN 978-0-521-81734-9.
- ——; Gautesen, A. K.; McMaken, H. (1982). Ray methods for waves in elastic solids. Pitman Advanced Pub. Program. ISBN 0-273-08453-4.
- —— (1975). A theory of elasticity with microstructure for directionally reinforced composites. Springer. ISBN 978-3-211-81234-1.
- —— (1973). Wave propagation in elastic solids. North-Holland Series in Applied Mathematics and Mechanics. North-Holland. ISBN 0-7204-0325-1.
