= Wave Motion (journal) =

- Discipline: Wave motion
- Language: English
- Edited by: William J. Parnell

Publication details
- History: 1979–present
- Publisher: Elsevier
- Frequency: 8/year
- Impact factor: 2.4 (2022)

Standard abbreviations
- ISO 4: Wave Motion

Indexing
- CODEN: WAMOD9
- ISSN: 0165-2125
- LCCN: 81644046

Links
- Journal homepage; Online access; Online archive

Wave Motion is a peer-reviewed scientific journal published by Elsevier. It covers research on the physics of waves, with emphasis on the areas of acoustics, optics, geophysics, seismology, electromagnetic theory, solid and fluid mechanics. Original research articles on analytical, numerical and experimental aspects of wave motion are covered.

The journal was established by editor in chief Jan D. Achenbach in 1979. In 2011, Andrew N. Norris joined as co-editor in chief, and became sole editor in chief in 2012. The role of editor in chief passed to William J. Parnell in 2017 and K.W. Chow became deputy editor in chief at this time.

== Abstracting and indexing ==
The journal is abstracted and indexed in:

- Current Contents/Engineering, Computing & Technology
- Current Contents/Physical, Chemical & Earth Sciences
- EBSCO databases
- Ei Compendex
- GEOBASE
- Inspec
- MathSciNet
- Science Citation Index Expanded
- Scopus
- zbMATH

According to the Journal Citation Reports, Wave Motion has a 2025 impact factor of 2.2.

== See also ==
- List of periodicals published by Elsevier
