= Marie-Therese Wolfram =

Austrian mathematician

Marie-Therese Wolfram (born 1982) is an Austrian applied mathematician whose research involves the mathematical modeling of crowd behavior, such as the motions of pedestrians in crowds and the dynamics of public opinion, including mean-field game theory and the use of inverse problems in transportation theory to infer crowd preferences. She is a professor in the Mathematics Institute of the University of Warwick in England.

== Education and career ==
Wolfram was born in 1982 in Vienna, and studied at Johannes Kepler University Linz, where she earned a diploma in 2005 and completed her doctorate in 2008. Her dissertation, Forward and Inverse Solvers for Electro-Diffusion Systems, was jointly supervised by Martin Burger and Christian Schmeiser. She received a habilitation in 2013 through the University of Vienna.

After postdoctoral research at the University of Cambridge from 2008 to 2010, as a Hertha Firnberg Scholar at the University of Vienna from 2010 to 2013, and at King Abdullah University of Science and Technology in Saudi Arabia from 2013 to 2014, she became a senior scientist in the new frontiers group of the Johann Radon Institute for Computational and Applied Mathematics (RICAM) of the Austrian Academy of Sciences, from 2014 to 2017.

She took her present position as an assistant professor at the University of Warwick in 2016. She was promoted to associate professor in 2018 and to full professor in 2021.

== Recognition ==
Wolfram was a 2023 recipient of the Whitehead Prize of the London Mathematical Society, "for her groundbreaking contributions to applied partial differential equations, mathematical modelling in socio-economic applications and the life sciences, and numerical analysis of partial differential equations".
