= Jan Nekovář =

Czech academic and mathematician (1963–2022)

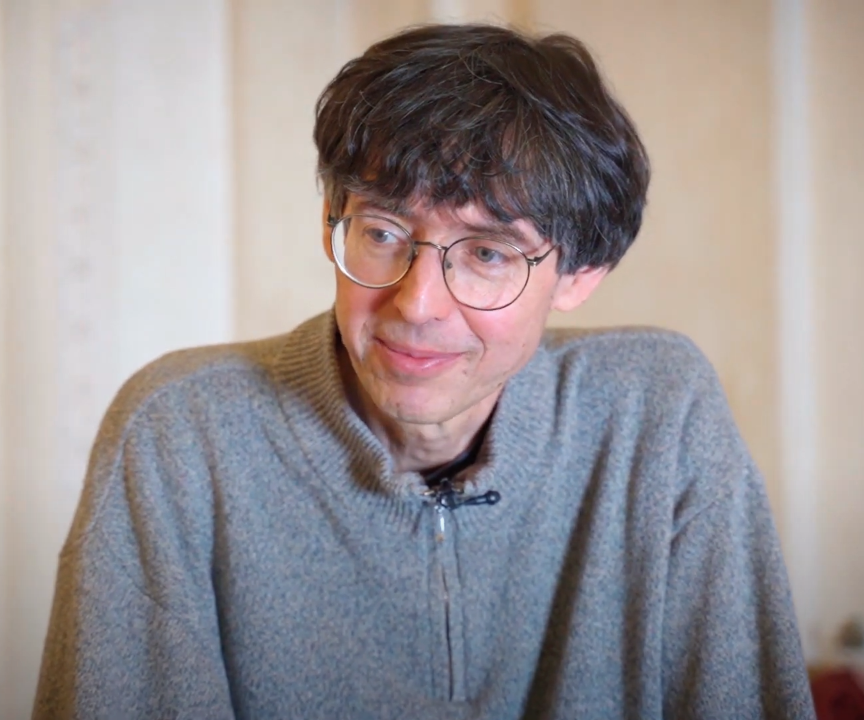
- Nekovář in 2019
- Born: 1963
- Died: 14 November 2022 (aged 59); Paris, France
- Education: Charles University; Moscow State University; Czechoslovak Academy of Sciences
- Occupations: Professor; Mathematician

Jan Nekovář (1963 – 14 November 2022) was a Czech academic and mathematician who specialized in number theory.

== Biography ==
Nekovář first studied at Charles University in Prague and was an exchange student at Moscow State University from 1984 to 1985. He obtained his doctorate from the Czechoslovak Academy of Sciences in 1991 with a thesis titled Modulární formy necelé váhy. From 1991 to 1993, he was a postdoctoral researcher at the University of California, Berkeley. In 1993, he became an assistant professor at Charles University, where he became a lecturer in 1995. He taught at Christ's College, Cambridge from 1995 to 2002 and subsequently became a professor at Pierre and Marie Curie University.

Nekovář was a visiting researcher at the Steklov Institute of Mathematics from 1988 to 1989, at the Max Planck Institute for Mathematics from 1989 to 1990, at the Isaac Newton Institute in 1998, the École normale supérieure in 1991, as well as the University of Minnesota, the Centre de Recerca Matemàtica, the Fields Institute, and the Erwin Schrödinger International Institute for Mathematical Physics.

Jan Nekovář died in Paris on 14 November 2022, at the age of 59.

== Awards ==
- Whitehead Prize (1998)
- G. de B. Robinson Award (2014)
- Neuron Prize for Important Scientific Discovery (2019)

== Publications ==
- "Class numbers of quadratic fields and Shimura's correspondence." (1990)
- "On p-adic height pairings" (1991)
- Selmer complexes (2006)
- "The Euler system method for CM points on Shimura curves" (2007)
- "Eichler-Shimura relations and semisimplicity of étale cohomology of quaternionic Shimura varieties" (2018)
- "Semisimplicity of certain Galois representations occurring in étale cohomology of unitary Shimura varieties" (2019)
