= Valeria Simoncini =

Italian researcher

Valeria Simoncini (born 1966) is an Italian researcher in numerical analysis who works as a professor in the mathematics department at the University of Bologna. Her research involves the computational solution of equations involving large matrices, and their applications in scientific computing. She is the chair of the SIAM Activity Group on Linear Algebra.

== Education and career ==
Simoncini earned a degree from the University of Bologna in 1989, became a visiting scholar at the University of Illinois at Urbana–Champaign from 1991 to 1993, and completed her PhD at the University of Padua in 1994. After working at CNR from 1995 to 2000, she returned to Bologna as an associate professor in 2000, and was promoted to full professor in 2010.

== Book ==
With Antonio Navarra, she is the author of the book A Guide to Empirical Orthogonal Functions for Climate Data Analysis (Springer, 2010).

== Recognition ==
Simoncini was a second-place winner of the Leslie Fox Prize for Numerical Analysis in 1997. In 2014 she was elected as a fellow of the Society for Industrial and Applied Mathematics "for contributions to numerical linear algebra". She was named to the 2021 class of fellows of the American Mathematical Society "for contributions to computational mathematics, in particular to numerical linear algebra". In 2023, she was elected to serve on the SIAM Council.
