= Jens Marklof =

German mathematician (born 1971)

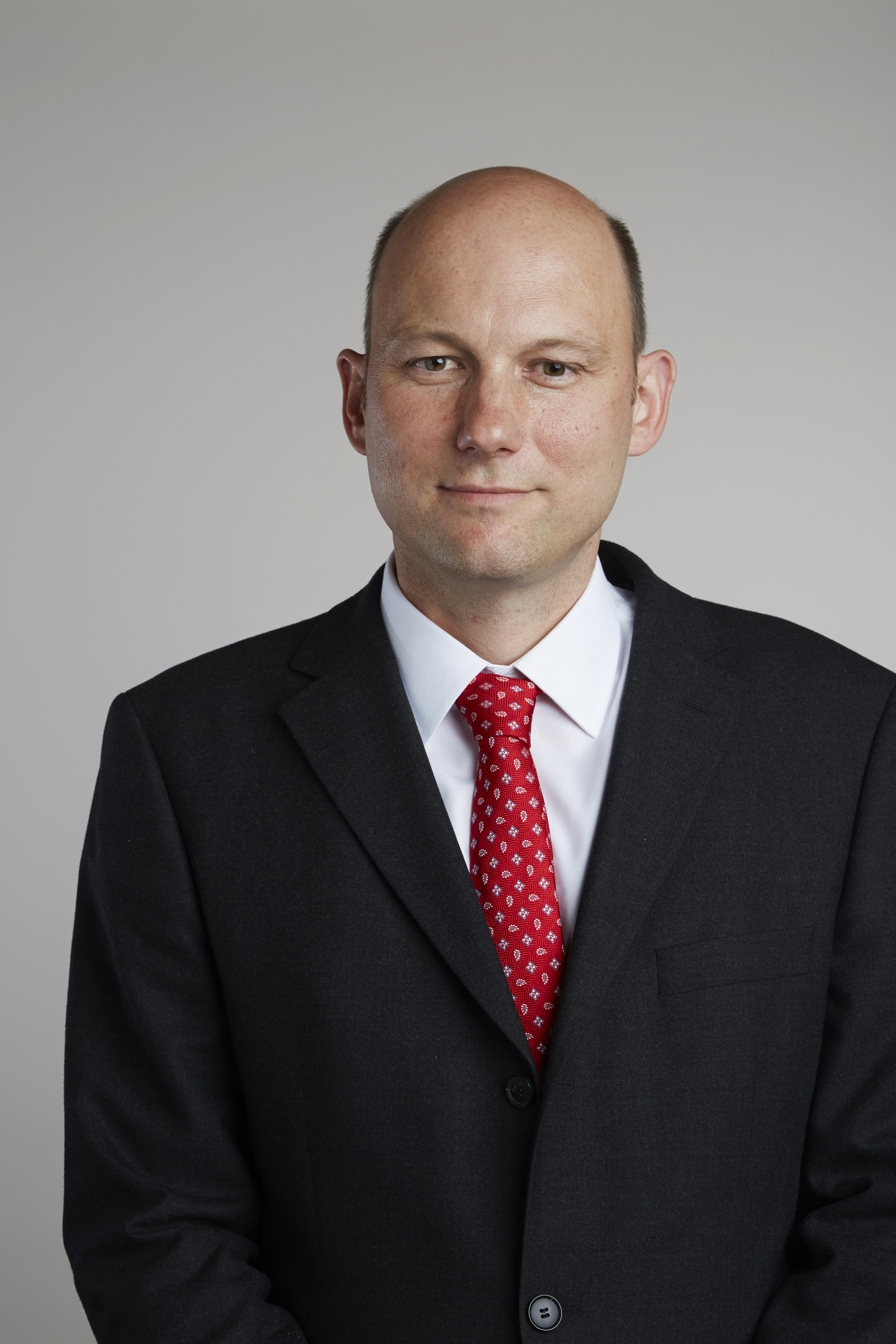
- Marklof in 2015, portrait via the Royal Society
- Education: Universität Hamburg; Universität Ulm
- Awards: Whitehead Prize (2010); FRS (2015)
- Scientific career
- Fields: Mathematics, Physics
- Workplaces: University of Bristol
- Website: www.maths.bris.ac.uk/~majm

Jens Marklof is a German mathematician working in the areas of quantum chaos, dynamical systems, equidistribution, modular forms and number theory. He will be president of the London Mathematical Society in the period 2023-2024.

Marklof is currently professor of mathematical physics at the University of Bristol, UK.

== Education ==
After studying physics at the University of Hamburg, Marklof was awarded a doctorate in 1997 at the University of Ulm.

== Awards and honours ==
In June 2010, Marklof was awarded the Whitehead Prize by the London Mathematical Society for his work on quantum chaos, random matrices and number theory. Marklof was elected a Fellow of the Royal Society (FRS) in 2015.

== Publications ==
- "MathSciNet".
- "ArXiv".
- Marklof, Jens (2006). "Energy Level Statistics, Lattice Point Problems, and Almost Modular Functions". Frontiers in Number Theory, Physics, and Geometry I. Berlin, Heidelberg: Springer Berlin Heidelberg. pp. 163–181. doi:10.1007/978-3-540-31347-2_3. ISBN 978-3-540-23189-9.
