= Institute for Mathematics and its Applications =

US research institute

The Institute for Mathematics and its Applications located at the University of Minnesota is an organization established in 1982 by the National Science Foundation (NSF) of the United States.

== Objectives ==
The primary mission of the IMA is to increase the impact of mathematics by fostering interdisciplinary research and linking mathematics and scientific and technological problems from other disciplines and industry.

== Activities ==
The IMA hosts long-term visitors, funds postdoctoral research positions, and holds several conferences annually. The NSF has granted the IMA $19.5 million over the period 2005–2010, the largest single mathematics grant the NSF has ever awarded.

== Prize in Mathematics and its Applications ==
The IMA annually awards a prize to a mathematician who has received their PhD within the last 10 years. This award recognizes an individual who has made a transformative impact on the mathematical sciences and their applications.

- 2019: Jacob Bedrossian
- 2018: Anders C. Hansen
- 2017: Jianfeng Lu
- 2016: Rachel Ward and Deanna Needell
- 2015: Jonathan Weare
- 2014: David F. Anderson

== Organization with similar names ==
Sharing a very similar name and the acronym IMA, it should not be confused with the Institute of Mathematics and its Applications, a professional body for mathematicians in the UK.
