= Mark Ainsworth =

British applied mathematician

- Citizenship: United Kingdom
- Education: Durham University (BSc, PhD)
- Awards: Whitehead Prize (2004)
- Scientific career
- Fields: Applied mathematics
- Workplaces: University of Strathclyde; Brown University
- Thesis: A Posteriori Error Estimation in the Finite Element Method (1989)
- Doctoral advisor: A. W. Craig
- Website: vivo.brown.edu/display/mainswor

Mark Ainsworth is a British mathematician. He is the Francis Wayland Professor of Applied Mathematics at Brown University.

== Education ==
Ainsworth studied mathematics at Durham University, where he graduated in 1986 with first-class honours and received the Collingwood Memorial Prize for the strongest performance in final exams. He completed his doctorate in 1989 from the same institution under the supervision of A. W. Craig.

== Research and career ==
Ainsworth held the 1825 Chair at the University of Strathclyde before joining Brown University.

He received the Whitehead Prize from the London Mathematical Society in 2004 for his contributions to numerical analysis.

== Selected publications ==
=== Books ===
- Ainsworth, Mark; Oden, J. Tinsley (2000). A Posteriori Error Estimation in Finite Element Analysis. Wiley-Interscience. doi:10.1002/9781118032824. ISBN 978-0471294115.

=== Journal articles ===
- Ainsworth, Mark; Craig, Alan (1991). "A posteriori error estimators in the finite element method". Numerische Mathematik. 60 (4): 429–464. doi:10.1007/BF01385730.
- ———; Oden, J. Tinsley (1997). "A posteriori error estimation in finite element analysis". Computer Methods in Applied Mechanics and Engineering. 142 (1–2): 1–88. doi:10.1016/S0045-7825(96)01107-3.
- ———; Fu, Guosheng (2018). "Fully computable a posteriori error bounds for hybridizable discontinuous Galerkin finite element approximations". Journal of Scientific Computing. 77 (1): 443–466. arXiv:1706.05778. doi:10.1007/s10915-018-0715-9.
- ———; Vejchodský, Tomáš (2019). "A simple approach to reliable and robust a posteriori error estimation for singularly perturbed problems". Computer Methods in Applied Mechanics and Engineering. 353: 373–390. arXiv:1812.07972. Bibcode:2019CMAME.353..373A. doi:10.1016/j.cma.2019.05.014.
