= Bethany Rose Marsh =

British mathematician

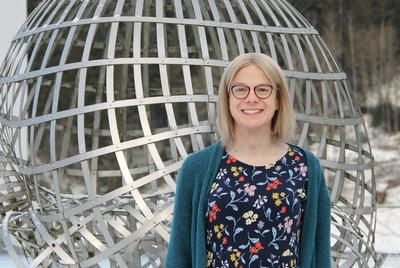
- Marsh in Oberwolfach, 2024
- Education: University of Oxford (BA); University of Warwick (MSc & PhD)
- Awards: Whitehead Prize (2009)
- Scientific career
- Fields: Mathematics
- Workplaces: University of Leeds; University of Leicester; University of Glasgow; Bielefeld University
- Doctoral advisor: Roger Carter

Bethany Rose Marsh is a mathematician working in the areas of cluster algebras, representation theory of finite-dimensional algebras, homological algebra, tilting theory, quantum groups, algebraic groups, Lie algebras and Coxeter groups. Marsh currently works at the University of Leeds as a Professor of pure mathematics. She was a EPSRC Leadership Fellow from 2008 to 2014. In addition to her duties at the University of Leeds, Marsh was an editor of the Glasgow Mathematical Journal from 2008 to 2013 and served on the London Mathematical Society editorial board from 2014 to 2018.

== Awards ==
In July 2009, Marsh was awarded the Whitehead Prize by the London Mathematical Society for her work on representation theory, and especially for her research on cluster categories and cluster algebras.

She was one of two 2024 Mary Cartwright Lecturers of the London Mathematical Society.

== Publications ==
- "MathSciNet".
- "ArXiv".
