= Kiswe (company) =

American streaming video company

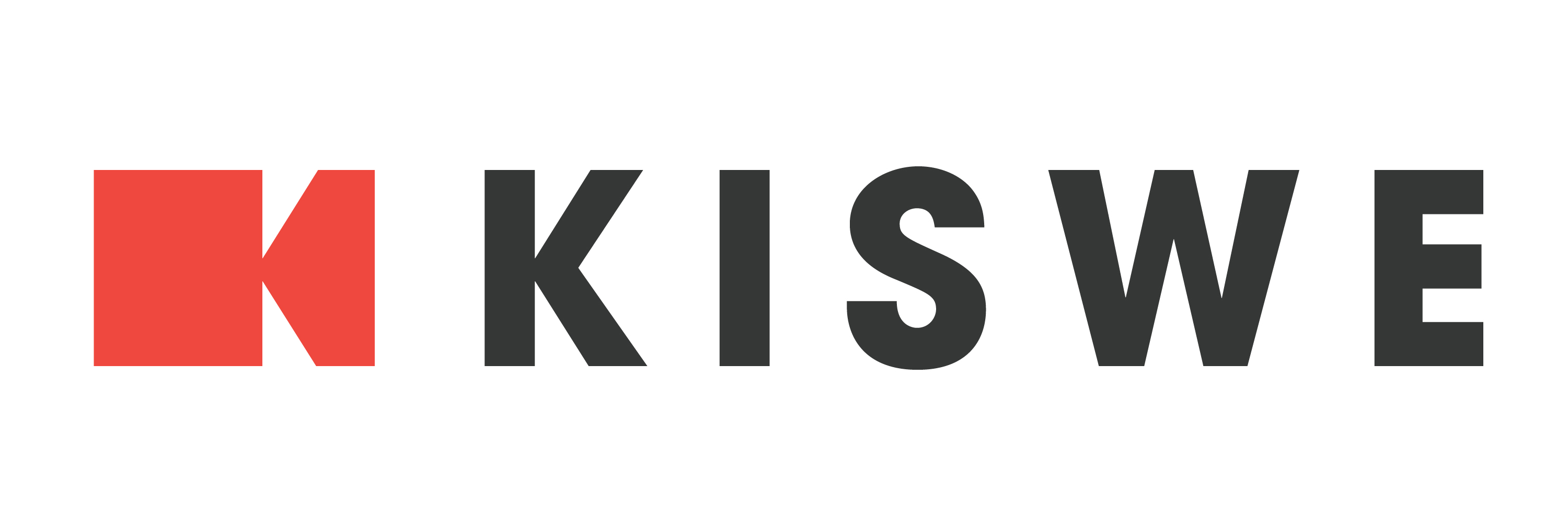
- Type: Private
- Industry: Video production; streaming media; broadcasting
- Founded: Autumn 2013
- Founder: Jeong Kim (Chairman); Jimmy Lynn (Vice-President Business Development); Wim Sweldens
- Headquarters: Murray Hill, New Jersey, United States
- Area served: Worldwide
- Key people: Glenn Booth (CEO); Mike Schabel (COO)
- Products: Kiswe Studio
- Website: kiswe.com

Kiswe Mobile, Inc., trading as Kiswe, is an internet video company based in Murray Hill, New Jersey. The company develops live streaming and interactive video platforms, particularly for sporting events and concerts.

== History ==
The company was started in autumn 2013. Its three founders are Jeong Kim, an engineer and former president of Bell Labs; Wim Sweldens, a scientist and innovator in communications and signal processing who had been at Alcatel-Lucent; and Jimmy Lynn, former sports executive with AOL and professor at Georgetown University’s McDonough School of Business. During its stealth mode period, Kim said the new venture was at the juncture of next-generation Web technology and sports and said that their "secret sauce" was the technology to allow interactive video to be applied to sports. Kim's initial goals were for $1 million in funding.

== Clients ==
Kiswe's first major client was the Washington Mystics of the WNBA, which launched a "Mystics Live" mobile app in May 2014 that offered free, in-market streaming of Mystics games, with a choice of multiple camera angles, on-demand instant replay, and in-game statistics. Kim is a partner of the team's parent company Monumental Sports & Entertainment. Sweldens described the app as a combination of a "first screen" experience of video with a second screen experience. The Mystics and WNBA were an effective vehicle for the application because the league is more open to new business ventures, and because the team's television broadcaster CSN Mid-Atlantic did not pay a rights fee to carry Mystics games.

Kiswe launched an app for the mixed martial arts promotion Professional Fighters League (PFL) in 2019, similarly integrating streams of events with real-time statistics, interactive polls, trivia, and prediction games, and the ability to create public and private lobbies with chat rooms. PFL CEO Pete Murray stated that the app was designed to also facilitate sports betting features in the future.

In July 2019, Kiswe announced a partnership with Vidgo to integrate social television features into its streaming television service. Vidgo also made an investment into Kiswe. Kiswe also partnered with the CrossFit Games to use its cloud-based production platform to allow for community-produced broadcasts of the 2019 CrossFit Games, which could be localized and tailored for different audiences and languages.

Amid the COVID-19 pandemic, Kiswe branched out into virtual concerts in 2020; on June 8, 2020, Kiswe announced a strategic "global partnership" with K-pop record label Big Hit Entertainment, with its first event being the BTS virtual concert Bang Bang Con: The Live. The event took in US$18.1 million in revenue, with Kiswe and Big Hit reporting a peak of over 756,000 concurrent viewers in 107 territories. The two companies launched a virtual concert platform, VenewLive, in September 2020: in March 2021, Universal Music Group and YG Entertainment made investments into VenewLive.

In April 2023, the Phoenix Suns of the NBA announced that Gray Television and Kiswe had acquired the regional rights to the team and WNBA Phoenix Mercury, replacing Bally Sports Arizona the 2023–24 season; Kiswe developed an over-the-top subscription service for the Suns called "Suns Live". Kiswe also partnered with the Utah Jazz on its "Jazz+" platform.

The American professional wrestling promotion All Elite Wrestling (AEW) partnered with Kiswe to develop an international streaming service called MyAEW. Available worldwide outside of the United States and Canada, MyAEW launched on March 9, 2026, as an over-the-top streaming service and digital television network, hosting all episodes of AEW's programs and all pay-per-view (PPV) events, live and on-demand, as well as hosting the archive for all prior programs and PPVs. It also hosts the archive for AEW's sister promotion Ring of Honor.
