= Nicholas Manton =

British mathematical physicist

- Born: 2 October 1952 (age 73); City of Westminster, London, England, UK
- Education: University of Cambridge (MA, PhD)
- Known for: Sphaleron; Type I supergravity
- Awards: Junior Whitehead Prize (1991); FRS (1996)
- Scientific career
- Fields: Mathematical physics; Elementary particle theory
- Workplaces: University of Cambridge
- Thesis: Magnetic Monopoles and Other Extended Objects in Field Theory (1978)
- Doctoral advisor: Peter Goddard

Nicholas Stephen Manton FRS (born 2 October 1952 in the City of Westminster) is a British mathematical physicist. He is a Professor of Mathematical Physics at the Department of Applied Mathematics and Theoretical Physics of the University of Cambridge and a fellow of St John's College.

== Education ==
Manton was educated at Dulwich College and St John's College, Cambridge, where he read mathematics. He earned his PhD from the University of Cambridge in 1978, under the supervision of Peter Goddard. His thesis was entitled Magnetic Monopoles and Other Extended Objects in Field Theory.

== Research ==
Manton has made contributions to the theory of soliton-like particles in two and three dimensions. He calculated the forces between static and moving monopoles and vortices in gauge theories, leading to the geometrical idea of moduli space dynamics. This has been applied to the classical, quantum and statistical mechanics of solitons. He has also developed the theory of skyrmions as a soliton model of atomic nuclei.

He discovered the unstable sphaleron solution in the electroweak sector of the Standard Model of particle physics. The Higgs field is topologically twisted within a sphaleron. The sphaleron defines an energy scale for baryon and lepton number violation in the early universe — an energy scale within the range of the Large Hadron Collider. His other work includes the construction of type I supergravity, a 10-dimensional supergravity theory with Yang–Mills fields, which is also a low-energy limit of superstring theory.

== Awards and honours ==
Manton was elected a Fellow of the Royal Society (FRS) in 1996.

== Publications ==
- Topological Solitons (Cambridge Monographs on Mathematical Physics), by N. Manton and P. Sutcliffe (Cambridge University Press, 2004) ISBN 978-0521838368.
- The Physical World: An Inspirational Tour of Fundamental Physics, by M. Manton and N. Mee (Oxford University Press, 2017) ISBN 978-0198795933.
- Skyrmions - A Theory Of Nuclei, by N. Manton (World Scientific, 2022) ISBN 978-1800612471.
