= Coralia Cartis =

Romanian mathematician

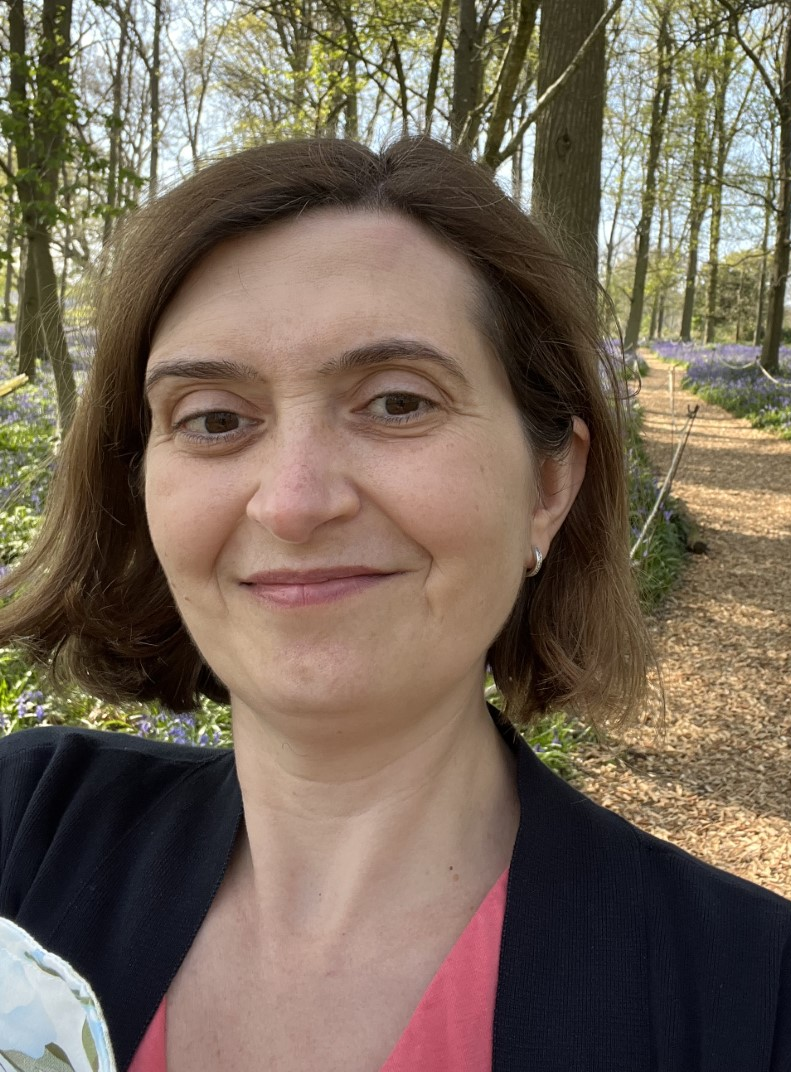
- Born: Cluj-Napoca, Romania
- Education: Babeș-Bolyai University (B.S.); University of Cambridge (Ph.D.)
- Awards: Leslie Fox Prize for Numerical Analysis
- Scientific career
- Workplaces: University of Edinburgh; University of Oxford
- Thesis: On Interior Point Methods for Linear Programming (2005)
- Doctoral advisor: Michael J. D. Powell
- Website: people.maths.ox.ac.uk/cartis/

Coralia Cartis is a Romanian mathematician at the University of Oxford whose research interests include compressed sensing, numerical analysis, and regularisation methods in mathematical optimization. At Oxford, she is a Professor in Numerical Optimization in the Mathematical Institute, and a tutorial fellow of Balliol College.

== Education and career ==
Born in Cluj-Napoca, Romania, Cartis earned a bachelor's degree in mathematics from Babeș-Bolyai University, and completed her PhD in 2005 at the University of Cambridge. Her dissertation, On Interior Point Methods for Linear Programming, was supervised by Michael J. D. Powell. In the same year, she was one of the Second Prize winners of the Leslie Fox Prize for Numerical Analysis.

After working as a researcher at the Rutherford Appleton Laboratory and a postdoctoral researcher at Oxford, she became a lecturer at the University of Edinburgh in 2007. She took her present position at Oxford in 2013.

In 2018 she became a member of the scientific board of the Smith Institute for Industrial Mathematics and System Engineering, and was a plenary speaker at the 16th EUROPT Workshop on Advances in Continuous Optimization in Spain.

Cartis was elected to the 2023 Class of SIAM Fellows.

== Selected bibliography ==
- Cartis, Coralia; Gould, Nicholas I. M.; Toint, Philippe L. (2011). "Adaptive cubic regularisation methods for unconstrained optimization. Part I: motivation, convergence and numerical results". Mathematical Programming. 127 (2): 245–295. doi:10.1007/s10107-009-0286-5.
- Boumal, Nicolas; Absil, P-A; Cartis, Coralia (2019-01-25). "Global rates of convergence for nonconvex optimization on manifolds". IMA Journal of Numerical Analysis. 39 (1): 1–33. arXiv:1605.08101. doi:10.1093/imanum/drx080.
- Cartis, C.; Gould, Nicholas I. M.; Toint, Ph. L. (2022). Evaluation complexity of algorithms for nonconvex optimization: theory, computation, and perspectives. Philadelphia: Society for Industrial and Applied Mathematics. ISBN 978-1-61197-698-4. OCLC 1295352789.
