= Carola-Bibiane Schönlieb =

Austrian mathematician

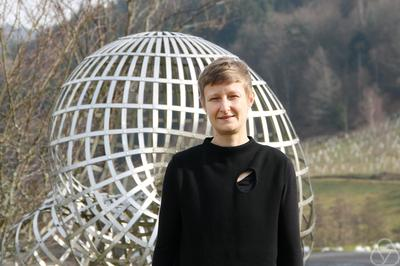
- Schönlieb at Oberwolfach in 2018
- Education: University of Vienna; University of Cambridge; (PhD)
- Scientific career
- Workplaces: University of Cambridge
- Thesis: Modern PDE Techniques for Image Inpainting (2009)
- Doctoral advisor: P.A. Markowich
- Website: www.damtp.cam.ac.uk/user/cbs31/Home.html

Carola-Bibiane Schönlieb (born 1979) is an Austrian mathematician who works in image processing and partial differential equations. She is a Fellow of Jesus College, Cambridge and Professor of Applied Mathematics in the Department of Applied Mathematics and Theoretical Physics at the University of Cambridge. She is the author of the book Partial Differential Equation Methods for Image Inpainting (Cambridge University Press, 2015), on methods for using the solutions to partial differential equations to fill in gaps in digital images.

Schönlieb earned a master's degree in mathematics from the University of Salzburg in 2004. She completed her Ph.D. at Cambridge in 2009. Her dissertation, Modern PDE Techniques for Image Inpainting, was supervised by Peter Markowich. After postdoctoral study at the University of Göttingen she returned to Cambridge as a lecturer in 2010.

In 2016 Schönlieb won the Whitehead Prize of the London Mathematical Society "for her spectacular contributions to the mathematics of image analysis". She won a Philip Leverhulme Prize in 2017, and is the 2018 Mary Cartwright Lecturer of the London Mathematical Society. Since 2016 she has also been a Fellow of the Alan Turing Institute. Carola is Director of the Cantab Capital Institute for the Mathematics of Information and she is co-director of the Centre for Mathematical Imaging in Healthcare—both are based at the University of Cambridge. In 2021 she was elected Council Members-at-Large for SIAM for a term running January 1, 2022 - December 31, 2024. In 2022, she received an honorary doctorate from the University of Klagenfurt. She is a SIAM Fellow, in the 2024 class of fellows.

Schönlieb is married to Bertram Düring, a mathematician at the University of Warwick.
