= Catharina Stroppel =

German mathematician (born 1971)

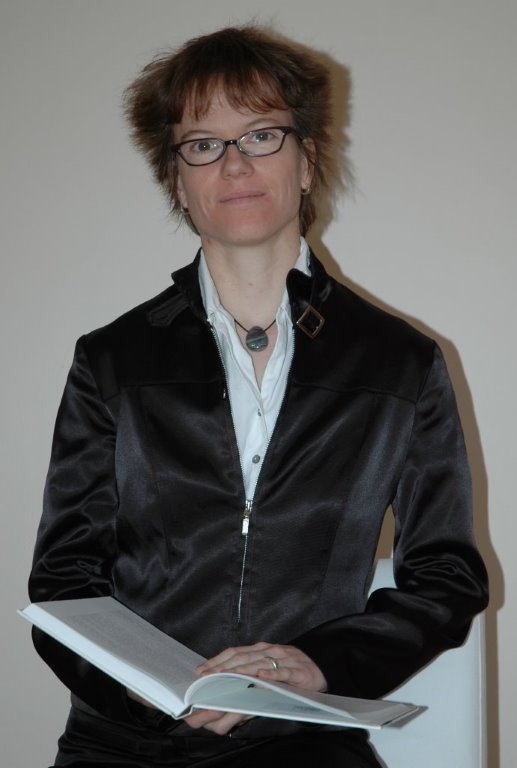
Stroppel in Princeton, 2008

Catharina Stroppel (born 1971) is a German mathematician whose research concerns representation theory, low-dimensional topology, and category theory. She is a professor of mathematics at the University of Bonn, and vice-coordinator of the Hausdorff Center for Mathematics in Bonn.

== Education and career ==
Stroppel earned a diploma in mathematics and theology from the University of Freiburg in 1998. She completed her doctorate, also from the University of Freiburg, in 2001, under the supervision of Wolfgang Soergel. After short-term positions at the University of Leicester and Aarhus University, she joined the University of Glasgow as a research associate in 2004, and was promoted to lecturer in 2005 and reader in 2007. In 2008 she moved to Bonn as a professor.

== Awards and honors ==
In 2007, the London Mathematical Society awarded Stroppel their Whitehead Prize "for her contributions to representation theory, in particular in the framework of categorifications and its applications to low-dimensional topology". She was an invited speaker at the 2010 International Congress of Mathematicians. In 2018, she became a member of the German Academy of Sciences Leopoldina. She was named MSRI Simons Professor for 2009–2010. She was awarded a 2023 Gottfried Wilhelm Leibniz Prize “in recognition of her excellent work in representation theory, especially on the topic of category theory.”
