= Peter Topping =

British mathematician

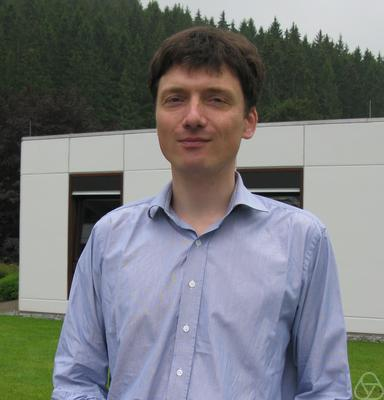
Peter Topping

Peter Topping (born 1971) is a British mathematician working in geometric analysis.

He obtained his PhD in 1997 at the University of Warwick under the supervision of Mario Joseph Micallef. He is currently Professor at the University of Warwick.

In 2005 he was awarded the LMS Whitehead Prize and in 2006 he was awarded the Philip Leverhulme Prize.

Topping is the author of the 2006 book Lectures on the Ricci Flow. He was an invited speaker at the International Congress of Mathematicians in 2014 at Seoul.

== Books ==
- Topping, Peter (2006). Lectures on the Ricci Flow. Cambridge: Cambridge University Press. ISBN 978-0-511-72146-5. OCLC 776958754.
