= Christopher Budd (mathematician) =

British mathematician

Christopher John Budd OBE is a British mathematician known especially for his contribution to non-linear differential equations and their applications in industry. He is currently Professor of Applied Mathematics at the University of Bath, and was Professor of Geometry at Gresham College from 2016 to 2020.

== Education ==
Budd gained his Bachelor's degree in mathematics at St John's College, Cambridge, where he was senior wrangler. He went on to be awarded a D.Phil. from Oxford University, studying numerical methods for nonlinear elliptic partial differential equations under the supervision of John Norbury.

== Career ==
He spent three years as a fellow of St John's College, Oxford, working in numerical analysis at the Oxford University Computing Laboratory and as a fellow sponsored by the CEGB developing numerical methods for third-order partial differential equations. He went on to a permanent post as a lecturer in numerical analysis at the University of Bristol before gaining a position as Professor of Applied Mathematics at the University of Bath in 1995. He was appointed the Professor of Geometry at Gresham College in 2016, where he delivered a series of public lectures on Mathematics and the Making of the Modern World. He has also held a Chair of Mathematics at the Royal Institution, and Professor of the Public Understanding of Mathematics at the International Centre for Mathematical Sciences, Edinburgh

His research interests involve the analysis, application and numerical analysis of the solution of nonlinear differential equations with a particular emphasis on problems which arise in industry. His recent work has been in geometric integration which aims to develop numerical methods which reproduce qualitative structures in differential equations.

He is co-director of the interdisciplinary Centre for Nonlinear Mechanics at the University of Bath and is active in promoting interdisciplinary collaboration both nationally and internationally.

Budd is a passionate populariser of mathematics, reflected in his appointment as Chair of Mathematics of the Royal Institution of Great Britain in 2000. He works on a number of projects with schools and has written a book, "Mathematics Galore", based on his series of popular talks. He has also made numerous guest appearances on national radio and television, such as on the BBC's The One Show and popular science panel comedy game show It's Only a Theory.

He won the Leslie Fox Prize for Numerical Analysis in 1991. In 1999 he was one of ten scientists awarded the title of "Scientist for the new century" by the Royal Institution. In 2001 he was one of 20 lecturers in the UK to be awarded an ILT Teaching Fellowship, and he was nominated the LMS popular lecturer in applied mathematics. He was awarded the Order of the British Empire (OBE) in the Queen's Birthday Honours List in 2015 for services to science and maths education. In 2026 he was appointed as one of the first 100 Fellows of the Academy for the Mathematical Sciences. In 2026 he was awarded the IMA Gold Medal

== Bibliography ==
- Christopher Budd and Christopher Sangwin, Mathematics Galore!: Masterclasses, Workshops and Team Projects in Mathematics and Its Applications, Oxford University Press (2001) ISBN 0-19-850770-4.

== See also ==
- Leslie Fox Prize for Numerical Analysis
