= Michael Magee (mathematician) =

Northern Irish mathematician

Michael Magee is a Northern Irish mathematician. He is Professor of Mathematics at Durham University.

Magee studied mathematics at the University of Cambridge, graduating with first-class honours in 2007, and completed Part III the following year. He received his PhD in 2014 from the University of California, Santa Cruz, where he was supervised by Alexander Gamburd. In 2022, Magee, working alongside his doctoral student Will Hide, confirmed the existence of a conjecture about complex surfaces dating back to 1984.

He was awarded the Whitehead Prize by the London Mathematical Society in 2021, and the Philip Leverhulme Prize in 2023.

== Selected publications ==
- Gamburd, Alexander; Magee, Michael; Ronan, Ryan (2019). "An asymptotic formula for integer points on Markoff–Hurwitz varieties". Annals of Mathematics. 190 (3): 751–809. arXiv:1603.06267. doi:10.4007/annals.2019.190.3.2.
- Magee, Michael; Naud, Frédéric; Puder, Doron (2022). "A random cover of a compact hyperbolic surface has relative spectral gap 3/16 − ε". Geometric and Functional Analysis. 32 (3): 595–661. arXiv:2003.10911. doi:10.1007/s00039-022-00602-x.
- Hide, Will; Magee, Michael (2023). "Near optimal spectral gaps for hyperbolic surfaces". Annals of Mathematics. 198 (2): 791–824. arXiv:2107.05292. doi:10.4007/annals.2023.198.2.6.
- Magee, Michael; Puder, Doron (2023). "The asymptotic statistics of random covering surfaces". Forum of Mathematics, Pi. 11: e15. arXiv:2003.05892. doi:10.1017/fmp.2023.13.
- Louder, Lars; Magee, Michael; Hide, Will (2025). "Strongly convergent unitary representations of limit groups". Journal of Functional Analysis. 288 (6) 110803. arXiv:2210.08953. doi:10.1016/j.jfa.2024.110803.
