= Markus Owen =

Markus Roger Owen
- Education: University of Warwick
- Awards: Whitehead Prize (2009)
- Scientific career
- Fields: Applied Mathematics
- Workplaces: University of Nottingham
- Doctoral advisor: Jonathan Sherratt

Markus Roger Owen is an applied mathematician working in a diverse field of subjects. This has included research into macrophage-tumour interactions, neural field theories, juxtacrine intercellular signalling, the effect of predation on biological invasions, mode-locking of periodically stimulated bursting neurons, lung ventilation and rheumatoid arthritis. Owen is currently a Professor in applied mathematics at the University of Nottingham's School of Mathematical Sciences.

== Awards ==
In July 2009, Owen was awarded the Whitehead Prize by the London Mathematical Society for his contributions to the development of multiscale modelling approaches in systems medicine and biology.

== Publications ==
- "Markus Owen's Homepage".
- "Zentralblatt MATH".
