= Anna-Karin Tornberg =

Swedish mathematician

Anna-Karin Tornberg is a Swedish mathematician currently at Royal Institute of Technology who was awarded the Göran Gustafsson Prize and Leslie Fox Prize for Numerical Analysis and elected to the Royal Swedish Academy of Engineering Sciences. Her research concerns computational mathematics.

As a faculty member at New York University in 2006, Tornberg won a Sloan Research Fellowship. She was an invited speaker on numerical analysis and scientific computing at the 2018 International Congress of Mathematicians. She is an alumna of the Global Young Academy
