= Zagórski =

Zagórski (feminine Zagórska, plural Zagórscy) is a Polish surname. At the beginning of the 1990s there were approximately 7040 people in Poland with this surname.

When transcribed via the Russian language, it may be spelled Zagorsky, the Russian-language feminine form being Zagorskaya. In other languages, the surname may be phonetically transcribed as Zagurski.

People named Zagórski:

- Aiga Zagorska (born 1970), Lithuanian track and road cyclist
- Aniela Zagórska (1890–1943), Polish translator
- Dorota Zagórska (born 1975), Polish pairs skater
- Edmund Zagorski (1954–2018), American convicted murderer
- Jerzy Zagórski (1907–1984), Polish poet, essayist and translator
- Kazimierz Zagórski (1883–1944), Polish photographer
- Krzysztof Zagórski (born 1967), Polish footballer
- Marek Zagórski (born 1967), Polish politician
- Sylwia Zagórska, Polish tennis player
- Tommy Zagorski (born 1984), American football coach
- Wacław Zagórski (1909–1982), Polish journalist
- Witold Zagórski (1930–2016), Polish basketball player and coach
- Wojciech Zagórski (1928–2016), Polish actor
- Wojciech Zagórski (skier), see FIS Alpine World Ski Championships 2007 – Men's slalom
- Włodzimierz Zagórski (general) (1882–1927), Polish general
- Włodzimierz Zagórski (writer) (1834–1902), Polish writer, satirist; pseudonyms Chochlik, Publikola
- Pauline Lee Zagorski, previous married name of Pauline Hanson (born 1954), Australian politician

People named Zagorsky:

- Kyra Zagorsky (born 1976), American actress
- Nikolai Zagorsky (1849–1893), Russian painter
- Valeriy Zagorsky (born 1955), Russian philatelist, publisher, businessman

Zagorski may also refer to:

- Zagorski (village), Bulgaria
