= Jonathan Sherratt =

British mathematician

Jonathan Adam Sherratt FRSE (born 2 February 1967) is a British mathematician. He is Professor of Mathematics at Heriot-Watt University. His research is in the field of mathematical biology.

Sherratt attended Tiffin School. He studied mathematics at Queens' College, Cambridge, graduating with first-class honours in 1988. He received his DPhil in 1991 from Lincoln College, Oxford. He has been a Fellow of the Royal Society of Edinburgh since 2001.

He was awarded the Whitehead Prize by the London Mathematical Society in 2006.
