= Zagurski =

Zagurski is the phonetically transcribed Polish surname Zagórski. Notable people with the surname include:

- Mike Zagurski (born 1983), American baseball player
- Walter Zagurski (1911–1959), Lithuanian-born American weightlifter
