= Shephard Prize =

Mathematics prize

- Country: United Kingdom
- Presented by: London Mathematical Society (LMS)
- Eligibility: Mathematician normally resident in the United Kingdom
- Established: 2015
- Website: www.lms.ac.uk/prizes/shephard-prize

The Shephard Prize was instituted in 2015 and is awarded by the London Mathematical Society to a mathematician or mathematicians for making a contribution to mathematics with a strong intuitive component which can be explained to those with little or no knowledge of university mathematics, though the work itself may involve more advanced ideas. The prize is awarded biennially (every two years) in even-numbered years and is the result of a donation made to the Society by Geoffrey Shephard. The Shephard Prize may not be awarded to any person who has received the De Morgan Medal or the Pólya Prize.

== Winners ==
The winners of the Shephard Prize have been:

- 2015 Keith Ball
- 2020 Desmond Higham
- 2020 Kenneth Falconer
- 2022 Andrew Lobb
- 2024 Samir Siksek

== See also ==
- List of mathematics awards
