= Desmond Higham =

British mathematician

- Born: 17 February 1964 (age 62); Salford
- Citizenship: British
- Education: Victoria University of Manchester (BSc PhD 1988)
- Awards: Society for Industrial and Applied Mathematics (SIAM) Germund Dahlquist Prize (2005) Fellow of the Royal Society of Edinburgh (2006); SIAM Fellow (2009); EPSRC Established Career Fellowship (2015–2019); London Mathematical Society Shephard Prize (2020); Edinburgh Mathematical Society Impact Prize (2024) European Research Council Advanced Grant (2026)
- Scientific career
- Fields: Numerical analysis
- Workplaces: University of Edinburgh
- Doctoral advisor: George Hall

Desmond John Higham (born 17 February 1964 in Salford) is an applied mathematician and Professor of Numerical Analysis the School of Mathematics at the University of Edinburgh, United Kingdom.

He is a graduate of the Victoria University of Manchester gaining his BSc in 1985, MSc in and 1986 and PhD 1988. He was a postdoctoral Fellow at the University of Toronto before taking up a Lectureship at the University of Dundee in 1990 and moving to a Readership at the University of Strathclyde in 1996. He was made Professor in 1999 and awarded the "1966 Chair of Numerical Analysis" in 2011. He moved to the University of Edinburgh in April 2019.

Higham's main area of research is stochastic computation, with applications in artificial intelligence, data science, network science and computational biology.

He held a Royal Society Wolfson Research Merit Award (2012–2017) and is a Society for Industrial and Applied Mathematics (SIAM) Fellow and Fellow of the Royal Society of Edinburgh. He won the SIAM Germund Dahlquist Prize (2005). In 2020 he was awarded the Shephard Prize from the London Mathematical Society In 2024 he was awarded the Impact Prize from the Edinburgh Mathematical Society He held an Established Career Fellowship from the EPSRC/URKI Digital Economy programme and was institutional lead on the EPSRC Mathematical Sciences Programme Grant Inference, Computation and Numerics for Insights into Cities (ICONIC). He currently holds an Advanced Grant from the European Research Council for the project "Numerical Analysis for Stable AI." He was a member of Sub-panel 10, Mathematical Sciences, for the 2021 UK Research Excellence Framework (REF 2021) and will also serve on the REF 2029 Sub-panel. He is a member of the Physical Sciences Panel for the 2026 Hong Kong Research Assessment Exercise.

Higham has authored five books:

- Numerical Methods for Ordinary Differential Equations: Initial Value Problems (2010, with D. F. Griffiths),
- An Introduction to Financial Option Valuation: Mathematics, Stochastics and Computation (2004),
- MATLAB Guide (with his late brother Nicholas Higham, 3rd edition, 2017),
- Learning LaTeX (with D. F. Griffiths, 2nd edition 2016),
- An Introduction to the Numerical Simulation of Stochastic Differential Equations (2021, with P. E. Kloeden).

He also edited the book

- Network Science: Complexity in Nature and Technology (2010, with Ernesto Estrada, Maria Fox and Gian-Luca Oppo).

He served as Editor-in-Chief of SIAM Review from 2016 to 2023 and is a member of the editorial boards of several leading journals.
