= Anders C. Hansen =

Norwegian mathematician

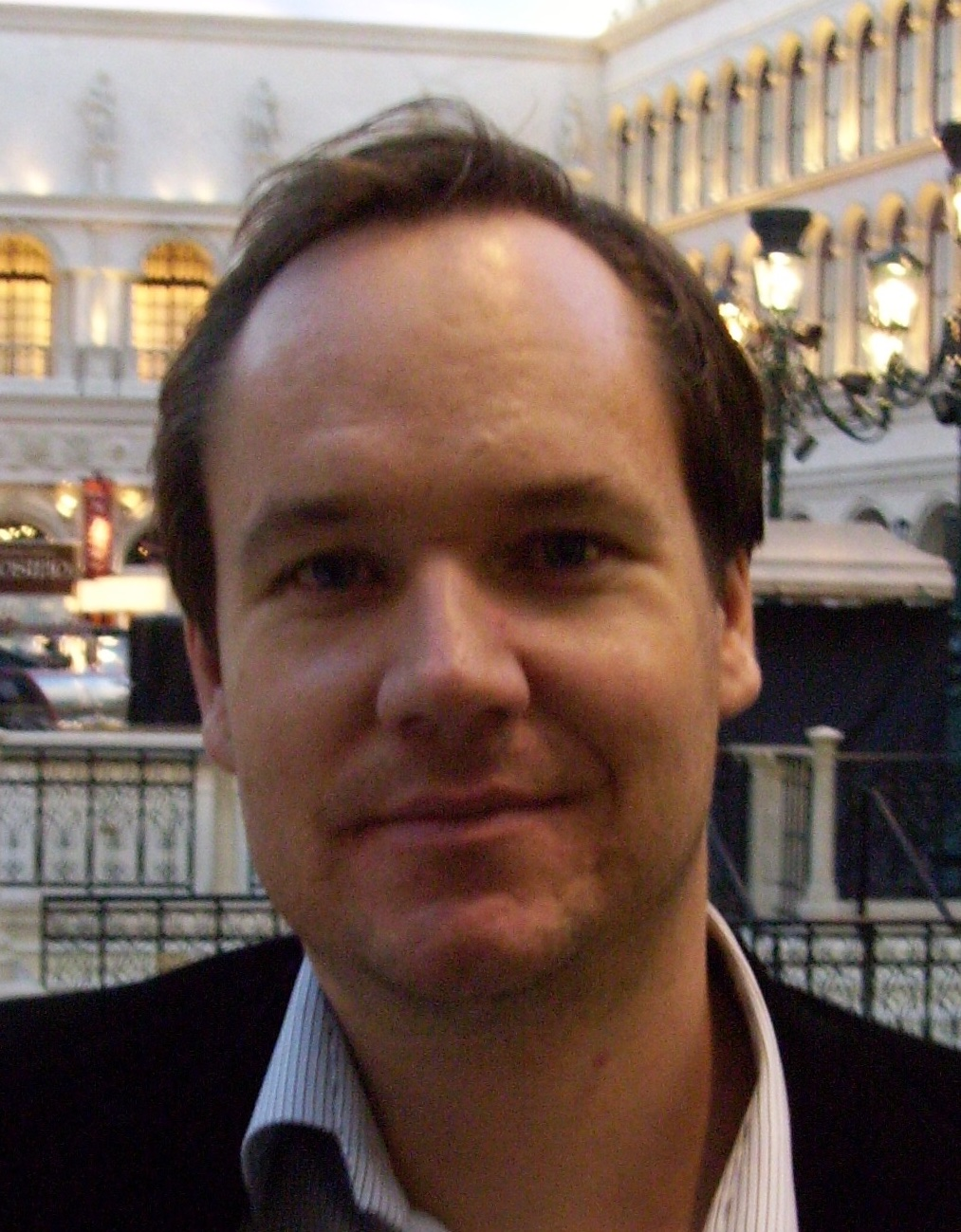
- Education: University of Cambridge; University of California, Berkeley; Norwegian University of Science and Technology
- Known for: Mathematical analysis Foundations of mathematics (computational); Data science
- Awards: Whitehead Prize (2019); IMA Prize in Mathematics and its Applications (2018); Leverhulme Prize (2017); Royal Society University Research Fellowship (2012)
- Scientific career
- Fields: Mathematics
- Workplaces: University of Cambridge; University of Oslo; California Institute of Technology
- Doctoral advisor: Arieh Iserles
- Doctoral students: Clarice Poon
- Website: www.damtp.cam.ac.uk/research/afha/anders/

Anders C. Hansen is a Norwegian mathematician, who is currently a Professor of Mathematics at University of Cambridge, where he is the head of the Applied Functional and Harmonic Analysis group, and also Professor II at the University of Oslo. He works in functional analysis, harmonic analysis (applied), foundations of mathematics (computational), data science and numerical analysis .

== Education ==
Hansen studied mathematics at the University of Cambridge, University of California, Berkeley and the Norwegian University of Science and Technology, where he was awarded a PhD (2008), a MA (2005) and a BA (2002) respectively.

== Career and research ==
He was a von Kármán instructor at California Institute of Technology from 2008 to 2009, held a junior research fellowship at Homerton College, Cambridge from 2009 to 2012, and held a Marie Skłodowska-Curie Actions fellowship at the University of Vienna in 2012. Since 2012, he has held a Royal Society University Research Fellowship (URF) at the University of Cambridge, where he is now a professor at the Faculty of Mathematics, University of Cambridge and a Bye-Fellow of Peterhouse.

Among other results, he has established the Solvability Complexity Index (SCI) and its following classification hierarchy. It is linked to Steve Smale's question on the existence of iterative convergent algorithms for polynomial root finding answered by Curt McMullen and Peter Doyle, as well as Alan Turing's work and the Arithmetical hierarchy.

=== Awards and honours ===
In 2017, he was awarded the Leverhulme Prize for having "solved very hard problems and opened new directions in areas of great impact in applied analysis [...] Notably, by introducing the Solvability Complexity Index he has made a major contribution to the advancement of Smale's programme on the foundation of computational mathematics". In 2018, he was awarded the IMA Prize in Mathematics and its Applications for having "made a transformative impact on the mathematical sciences and their applications [...] in particular, for his development of the Solvability Complexity Index and its corresponding classification hierarchy". In 2019, he was awarded the Whitehead Prize of the London Mathematical Society for having "contributed fundamentally to the mathematics of data, sampling theory, computational harmonic analysis and compressed sensing" and "especially his development of the Solvability Complexity Index and its corresponding classification hierarchy ".

== Selected publications ==
Research articles

- Hansen, Anders (12 July 2010). "On the Solvability Complexity Index, the 𝑛-pseudospectrum and approximations of spectra of operators". Journal of the American Mathematical Society. 24 (1). American Mathematical Society (AMS): 81–124. doi:10.1090/s0894-0347-2010-00676-5. ISSN 0894-0347.
- Antun, Vegard; Renna, Francesco; Poon, Clarice; Adcock, Ben; Hansen, Anders C. (11 May 2020). "On instabilities of deep learning in image reconstruction and the potential costs of AI". Proceedings of the National Academy of Sciences. 117 (48). Proceedings of the National Academy of Sciences: 30088–30095. arXiv:1902.05300. Bibcode:2020PNAS..11730088A. doi:10.1073/pnas.1907377117. ISSN 0027-8424. PMC 7720232. PMID 32393633.
- Colbrook, Matthew J.; Antun, Vegard; Hansen, Anders C. (16 March 2022). "The difficulty of computing stable and accurate neural networks: On the barriers of deep learning and Smale's 18th problem". Proceedings of the National Academy of Sciences. 119 (12) e2107151119. Bibcode:2022PNAS..11907151C. doi:10.1073/pnas.2107151119. ISSN 0027-8424. PMC 8944871. PMID 35294283. S2CID 247499099.
- ADCOCK, BEN; HANSEN, ANDERS C.; POON, CLARICE; ROMAN, BOGDAN (2017). "Breaking the Coherence Barrier: A New Theory for Compressed Sensing". Forum of Mathematics, Sigma. 5 e4. Cambridge University Press (CUP). arXiv:1302.0561. doi:10.1017/fms.2016.32. ISSN 2050-5094. S2CID 263901.
- Adcock, Ben; Hansen, Anders C. (20 August 2015). "Generalized Sampling and Infinite-Dimensional Compressed Sensing". Foundations of Computational Mathematics. 16 (5). Springer Science and Business Media LLC: 1263–1323. doi:10.1007/s10208-015-9276-6. ISSN 1615-3375. S2CID 223542.
- Colbrook, Matthew J.; Roman, Bogdan; Hansen, Anders C. (28 June 2019). "How to Compute Spectra with Error Control". Physical Review Letters. 122 (25) 250201. American Physical Society (APS). Bibcode:2019PhRvL.122y0201C. doi:10.1103/physrevlett.122.250201. ISSN 0031-9007. PMID 31347861. S2CID 198463498.

Research expository highlights

- A. Bastounis, A. C. Hansen, D. Higham, I. Tyukin and V. Vlacic: "Deep Learning: What Could Go Wrong?", SIAM News (October 2021).
- V. Antun, N. Gottschling, A. C. Hansen and B. Adcock, "Deep Learning in Scientific Computing: Understanding the Instability Mystery", SIAM News (March 2021).
- A. Bastounis, B. Adcock and A. C. Hansen, "From Global to Local: Getting More from Compressed Sensing", SIAM News (October 2017).

Books

- Adcock, Ben; Hansen, Anders C. (2021). Compressive imaging: structure, sampling, learning. Cambridge, United Kingdom: Cambridge University Press. ISBN 978-1-108-37744-7. OCLC 1260468467.
