= Applied Numerical Mathematics =

Scientific journal

- Discipline: Numerical analysis, computational mathematics
- Language: English
- Edited by: Zdzislaw Jackiewicz, Thiab Taha

Publication details
- History: 2001—present
- Publisher: Elsevier, International Association for Mathematics and Computers in Simulation
- Frequency: Monthly
- Impact factor: 2.3 (2025)

Standard abbreviations
- ISO 4: Appl. Numer. Math.

Indexing
- ISSN: 0168-9274 (print); 1873-5460 (web)

Links
- Journal homepage; Online access; Online archive

Applied Numerical Mathematics is a peer-reviewed scientific journal published monthly by Elsevier on behalf of International Association for Mathematics and Computers in Simulation. Established in 2001, it covers numerical analysis and computational mathematics as well as its applications in physics and engineering. Its current editors-in-chief are Zdzislaw Jackiewicz (Arizona State University) and Thiab Taha (University of Georgia).

== Abstracting and indexing ==
The journal is abstracted and indexed in:

- Current Contents/Physical, Chemical & Earth Sciences
- EBSCO databases
- Ei Compendex
- Inspec
- MathSciNet
- Science Citation Index Expanded
- Scopus
- zbMATH

According to the Journal Citation Reports, the journal has a 2025 impact factor of 2.3.
