= Ewelina Zatorska =

Polish mathematician

Ewelina Zatorska is a Polish mathematician who works in England as a professor of mathematics at the University of Warwick. Her research involves the mathematical analysis of partial differential equations such as the Navier–Stokes equations and the study of the existence and behavior of solutions to these equations.

== Education and career ==
Zatorska worked as a science entertainer at the Copernicus Science Centre, a science museum in Warsaw, before completing her master's degree in mathematics at the University of Warsaw in 2009. She completed her Ph.D. there in 2013, under the joint supervision of Piotr Mucha and Milan Pokorný.

She became an assistant professor at the University of Warsaw from 2013 to 2017, while also doing postdoctoral research at the École polytechnique in France from 2013 to 2014, working as a research assistant at the Polish Academy of Sciences from 2014 to 2015, and continuing her research as a Chapman Fellow at Imperial College London from 2015 to 2017. In 2017, she took a lectureship at University College London, where she was promoted to senior lecturer in 2020. In 2020 she moved to Imperial College London where she was promoted to reader in 2023. She also received a habilitation in 2021 through the University of Warsaw. In 2023 she moved to her present position as professor at the University of Warwick.

She is also a visiting professor and honorary staff member at Imperial College.

== Recognition ==
Zatorska received a 2025 Whitehead Prize. According to the prize citation, "She has made deep and lasting contributions to the mathematical theory of the compressible Navier–Stokes equations and other nonlinear PDEs. Her results on existence, regularity and asymptotic limits of solutions are at the forefront of current research developments in this area."
