= Ralf Teckentrup =

German businessman

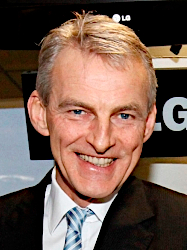
- 2011
- Born: 11 November 1957 (age 68); Beckum, Westphalia, West Germany
- Occupation: Former CEO of Condor Flugdienst

Ralf Teckentrup (born 11 November 1957) is a German businessman who was Chief executive officer (CEO) of Condor Flugdienst.

== Career ==
After studying industrial engineering at the University of Hamburg and the Hamburg University of Technology in Hamburg-Harburg he joined in 1986 Deutsche Lufthansa AG as a project manager in the area of corporate organization. Up until 1994, his work focused on reorganization projects as well as programs for cost reduction and strategic corporate development. Afterwards, he headed the corporate organization of Lufthansa, before in 1996 he headed the controlling of the marketing and sales department. In 1997 he was appointed as Divisional Director for controlling and administration and later for network management and marketing.

in 2003, Teckentrup subsequently took over responsibility for the areas of network management, IT, airport infrastructure and the purchasing department of Lufthansa Passage.

In 2004, Teckentrup was appointed to the Board of Thomas Cook AG and at the same time, as CEO, he took over the management of Condor Flugdienst, which he renovated in the following years, led back to the profit zone and leads until today.

In addition to his responsibilities in the Thomas Cook Group, Ralf Teckentrup holds mandates as a member of the Advisory Board of Deutsche Flugsicherung (DFS) and as a member of the Executive Committee of the Bundesverband der Deutschen Tourismuswirtschaft (BTW). In addition, he acts as Chairman of Bundesverband der Deutschen Fluggesellschaften (BDF), based in Berlin, since 2007.

== Personal life ==
Teckentrup is married and has two children. They live in Kronberg im Taunus (near Frankfurt Airport).
