= Filip Rindler =

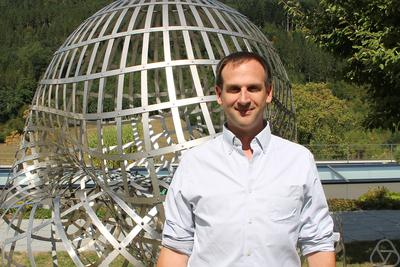
Rindler at Oberwolfach in 2026

Filip Rindler (born August 15, 1984 in Berlin) is an Austrian mathematician. After studying at TU Berlin, he finished his doctorate at the University of Oxford in 2011 under the supervision of Jan Kristensen. Since 2020 he is a Professor at the University of Warwick. He works on the calculus of variations, partial differential equations and geometric measure theory, as well as mathematical material science.

In 2018 he was awarded the prestigious Whitehead Prize of the London Mathematical Society for "his solutions to fundamental problems on the border between the theory of partial differential equations, calculus of variations and geometric measure theory". He received an ERC Starting Grant in 2017 and an ERC Consolidator Grant in 2024

== Selected publications ==
- De Philippis, Guido; Rindler, Filip (1 November 2016). "On the structure of \mathscr A-free measures and applications". Annals of Mathematics. 184 (3): 1017–1039. arXiv:1601.06543. doi:10.4007/annals.2016.184.3.10. ISSN 0003-486X. S2CID 67844397.
- Rindler, Filip (2018). Calculus of Variation. Universitext, Springer.
