= Yuying Li =

Chinese-Canadian professor of computer science

Yuying LI
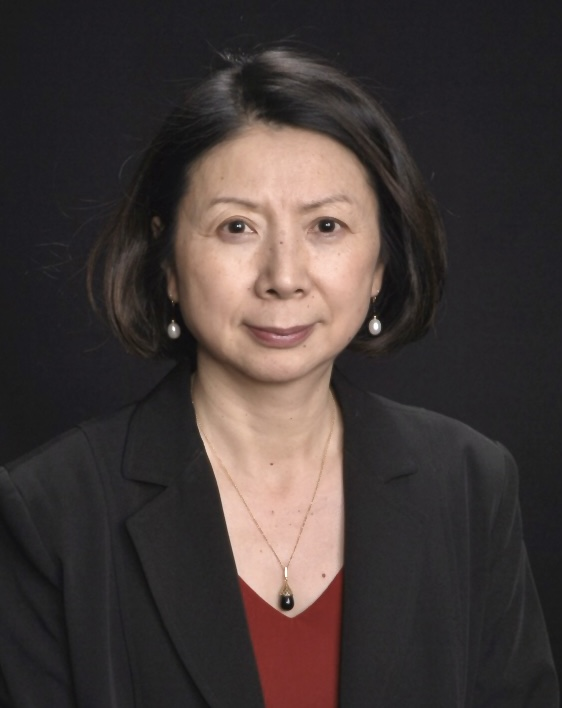
- Education: University of Waterloo, Ph.D., Mathematics, 1988
- Occupation: Professor of computer science in the David R. Cheriton School at University of Waterloo

Yuying Li is a Chinese-Canadian professor of computer science in the David R. Cheriton School of Computer Science at the University of Waterloo in Canada. Her research interests include mathematical optimization, scientific computing, data mining, and tail risk in computational finance.

== Education and career ==
After earning a bachelor's degree in mathematics in 1982 from Sichuan University, Li completed a PhD at the University of Waterloo, in 1988. Her dissertation, An Efficient Algorithm for Nonlinear Minimax Problems, was supervised by Andrew Conn.

She worked as a researcher at Cornell University before returning to Waterloo as a faculty member.

== Recognition ==
Li was the 1993 winner of the Leslie Fox Prize for Numerical Analysis.
