= Jeong H. Kim =

American electrical-engineer

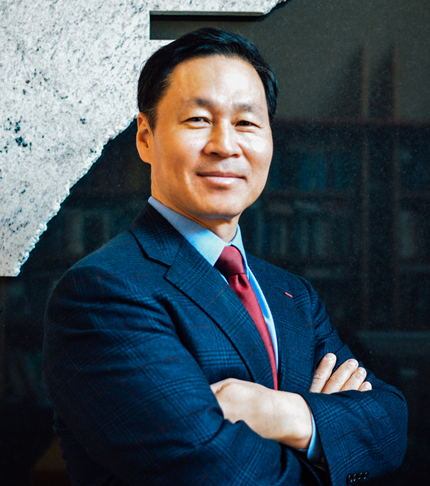
- Kim in 2016
- Born: August 13, 1960 (age 66); Seoul, South Korea
- Education: Johns Hopkins University (B.S., M.S.); University of Maryland, College Park (Ph.D.)
- Occupations: Executive Chairman of Kiswe Mobile; Partner at Monumental Sports & Entertainment
- Military career
- Allegiance: United States
- Branch: United States Navy
- Service years: 1982–1989
- Rank: Lieutenant commander
- Awards: Defense Meritorious Service Medal; Navy Achievement Medal

Jeong Hun Kim (Korean: 김종훈; born August 13, 1960) is a South Korean-born American academic, businessman, and entrepreneur in the technology industry.

In 2004, Kim was elected a member of the National Academy of Engineering for contributions to national defense and security through improved battlefield communication.

He served as the president of Bell Labs from 2005 to 2013.

== Early life ==
Born in Seoul, South Korea, Jeong Kim is a product of a broken home. His parents divorced when he was very young, and different relatives raised him while his father went to find work. He immigrated to the United States with his family in 1975 at 14. Speaking little English, he found the transition to a foreign culture difficult, but he found teachers who recognized his ambition and appetite for work and took a personal interest in him. Kim left home at 16, at one point sleeping in the basement of one of his high-school teachers. He worked the night shift at a 7-Eleven to support himself until he finished school.

== Education ==
Kim attended public schools throughout his K-12 education, graduating a semester early from high school. Having won a scholarship to Johns Hopkins University, Kim earned his bachelor's degree in electrical engineering and computer science in three years. During his seven-year stint in the U.S. Navy, Kim also earned a master's degree in technical management from Johns Hopkins University and, after returning to civilian life, earned a Ph.D. in reliability engineering from the University of Maryland, College Park – in only two years and while working full-time. His was the first doctorate to be awarded by the university in that discipline.

== Career ==
=== Early career ===
While still in college, he began to work for a start-up tech firm called Digitus (1980-1982). He became a partner in the company and believed he was well on his way to realizing significant financial returns from his stake in the enterprise. But upon graduation, he determined that it was time to repay his adopted country for the opportunities it had given him, so he left Digitus to join the U.S. Navy, where he served as a nuclear submarine officer (1982-1989).

As Digitus fell victim to the accelerating consolidation of the computer industry, Kim resolved that on leaving the Navy, he would start his own business and avoid the mistakes Digitus had made. However, unable to obtain financing for his start-up, he signed on as a contract engineer for AlliedSignal at the Naval Research Laboratory (1990-1993), where he became aware of the asynchronous transfer technology used to link different modes of electronic communication. He saw the need to bridge the gap between the integrated technology of the future and the many different systems in use today. For one, the military needed to link its divergent systems of voice, video, and data, especially from remote areas lacking communications infrastructure.

=== Yurie Systems (1992-1998) ===
In 1992, Kim borrowed against his house and his credit cards to start Yurie Systems Inc. Within five years, Yurie was taken public in February 1997 and later named the #1 Hot Growth Company among all public companies in the United States by BusinessWeek in May 1997. In 1998, Kim sold the company to Lucent Technologies for $1.1 billion. Kim personally received over $510 million after the sale.

=== Lucent Technologies (1998-2001) ===
At age 37, having sold Yurie, he stayed on with Lucent, serving first as president of carrier networks (1998-1999), then as president of the optical networking group (2000-2001), where he orchestrated a multibillion-dollar business turnaround that propelled Lucent's worldwide market share position from #4 in the optical space to #1 in four fiscal quarters.

In 1999, Kim co-founded Taconic Capital Advisors LLC, an event-driven and multi-strategy hedge fund firm, along with Kenneth Brody and Frank Brosens.

=== Post-Lucent Technologies (2002-2005) ===
Kim took a hiatus from Lucent in 2002 to join the University of Maryland faculty, with joint appointments in the Department of Electrical and Computer Engineering and the Department of Mechanical Engineering. While teaching, Kim assembled a group of investors to purchase Cibernet, a provider of cellular billing exchange services, and served as chairman from March 2003 until July 2005.

=== Bell Labs (2005-2013) ===
In 2005, he rejoined Lucent (which later became Alcatel-Lucent after its merger with the French telecom giant, Alcatel; Alcatel-Lucent has since been acquired by Nokia) to serve as president of its Bell Labs division. He was the institution's 11th president – and the first recruited from outside the Labs in its 80-year history. In the last two years of his eight-year tenure as the head of Bell Labs (2005-2013), Kim also served as Alcatel-Lucent's chief strategy officer.

=== Kiswe Mobile (2013-Present) ===
Kim left Alcatel-Lucent in 2013 and co-founded and became executive chairman of Kiswe Mobile Inc. – a start-up focused on interactive mobile video.

=== Other activities ===
Kim currently serves on the boards of Samsung, Arris Group and the Nuclear Threat Initiative (NTI). He was previously on the boards of Schneider Electric SA (France), McLeodUSA, MTI MicroFuel Cells, In-Q-Tel, Bankinter Foundation of Innovation (Spain), NASDAQ Listing and Hearing Review Council, Johns Hopkins University Applied Physics Laboratory, among many others. He also enjoys his position as a minority owner of Monumental Sports & Entertainment, which owns the National Hockey League's Washington Capitals, the National Basketball Association's Washington Wizards, the Women's National Basketball Association's Washington Mystics, the Arena Football League's Washington Valor, the Capital One Arena in Washington, D.C., and manages the Kettler Capitals Iceplex and George Mason University's EagleBank Arena.

Kim served on the boards of Johns Hopkins University, Georgetown University, the University of Maryland, and the Freeman Spogli Institute of International Studies at Stanford University. The University of Maryland recognized his contribution with the construction and naming of the Jeong H. Kim Engineering and Applied Science Building. The Stevens Institute of Technology honored him by conferring an Honorary Doctor of Engineering, as did Postech University in Korea with a Doctor of Science, Honoris Causa. In 2009, he was honored with the Chinese Institute of Engineers' Lifetime Achievement Award.

Kim was one of the founding partners of Venture Philanthropy Partners, an investment organization that provides money, expertise, and personal contacts to improve the lives and boost the opportunities of children and youth of low-income families. He also joined the board of DC2024, a group that attempted to bring the 2024 Summer Olympics to Washington D.C.

Kim served on the U.S. Presidential Commission on Review of U.S. Intelligence, the External Advisory Board of the CIA, and the Award Committee for the U.S. National Medal of Technology and Innovation. He currently serves on the board of the Nuclear Threat Initiative. In February 2013, he was nominated as the Minister of Future Creation and Science for South Korea; however, he withdrew his candidacy shortly after.

== Awards and recognition ==
- 2023: National Medal of Technology and Innovation
- 2016: Horatio Alger Award, Horatio Alger Association of Distinguished Americans
- 2013: Chevalier de la Légion d'Honneur, French Government
- 2012: Honorary Doctor of Engineering, Stevens Institute of Technology
- 2011: New Jersey Inventors Hall of Fame, Trustees Award
- 2010: Alumni Hall of Fame, University of Maryland
- 2010: Doctor of Science, Honoris Causa, Postech University, Korea
- 2009: Chinese Institute of Engineers' Lifetime Achievement Award
- 2009: CIA Director's Award (second award)
- 2009: Distinguished Lifetime Achievement Award, Asian American Engineer of the Year Special Awards
- 2007: Maryland Chamber of Commerce Business Hall of Fame
- 2007: Washington Chamber of Commerce Business Hall of Fame
- 2006: 5 Sectors Award, State of New Jersey
- 2005: President's Distinguished Alumnus Award, University of Maryland
- 2005: 10 Most Influential Asian American in Business, U.S. Pan Asian American Chamber of Commerce
- 2004: Innovation Hall of Fame, University of Maryland
- 2004: Blumenthal Award, Johns Hopkins University
- 2004: National Academy of Engineering
- 2001: CIA Director's Award
- 2000: Civil Merit Medal, Republic of Korea
- 1999: ICAS Liberty Award
- 1999: Ellis Island Medal of Honor
- 1999: Distinguished Alumnus Award, Johns Hopkins University
- 1999: American Immigration Law Foundation Immigrant Achievement Award
- 1999: BETA Award (Baltimore's Extraordinary Technology Advocate)
- 1999: KPMG Peat Marwick High Tech Entrepreneur
- 1998: Ernst & Young National Emerging Entrepreneur of the Year
- 1998: University of Maryland Distinguished Engineering Alumnus
- 1998: American Academy of Achievement Golden Plate
- 1998: Korea Society James A. Van Fleet Award
- 1998: KAA Businessman of the Year
- 1997: Maryland High Tech Council Entrepreneur of the Year
- 1989: Defense Meritorious Service Medal, USA
- 1987: Navy Achievement Medal, US Navy
