= Deanna Needell =

American mathematician

Deanna Needell is an American applied mathematician at the University of California, Los Angeles. She has authored over 200 research papers, graduated many PhD students and mentored a large number of postdocs. She is known for work on machine learning, optimization, and signal processing as well as applications involving community nonprofits in medicine and social justice.

== Education ==
Deanna Needell received her PhD in mathematics from the University of California, Davis in 2009. Her dissertation title was Topics in Compressed Sensing. She was a postdoctoral fellow at Stanford University from 2009-2011.

== Awards and honours ==
Deanna Needell received the IMA Prize in Mathematics and Applications in 2016 along with collaborator Rachel Ward. The award recognized their theoretical work related to compressed sensing with application to MRIs, with Needell recognized in particular for her contributions to sparse approximation, signal processing, and stochastic optimization. She is also the recipient of the Alfred P. Sloan Fellowship and a National Science Foundation CAREER Award. She was named a Fellow of the American Mathematical Society, in the 2022 class of fellows, "for contributions to compressed sensing and the mathematics of data". She is also a SIAM Fellow, in the 2024 class of fellows, elected "for contributions to compressed sensing, stochastic optimization, and applied data science". She has given a large number of plenary and keynote at conferences around the world, including the 2024 Falconer Lecture at the Mathematical Association of America (MAA) Mathfest.
