= Aretha Teckentrup =

British-based mathematician

Aretha Leonore Teckentrup is a UK-based mathematician, known for her research on uncertainty quantification and numerical analysis. Her work focuses on multilevel Monte Carlo methods for the numerical solution of partial differential equations, Gaussian processes and Bayesian inference. She is a reader in the mathematics of data science at the University of Edinburgh.

== Education and career ==
Teckentrup was a student in mathematics at the University of Bath beginning in 2005. She earned a master's degree there in 2009, and completed her PhD in 2013. Her dissertation, Multilevel Monte Carlo methods and Uncertainty Quantification, was supervised by Robert Scheichl.

After postdoctoral research with Max Gunzburger at Florida State University from 2013 to 2014 and with Andrew M. Stuart at the University of Warwick from 2014 to 2016, she became a lecturer at the University of Edinburgh in 2016.

== Recognition ==
Teckentrup was a second-place winner of the Leslie Fox Prize for Numerical Analysis in 2017. In 2018 she became the inaugural winner of the SIAG/Uncertainty Quantification Early Career Prize of the Society for Industrial and Applied Mathematics Activity Group on Uncertainty Quantification. She was one of the 2021 winners of the Whitehead Prize of the London Mathematical Society.
