= Martin Bridson =

British mathematician (born 1964)

Martin Bridson FRS MAE
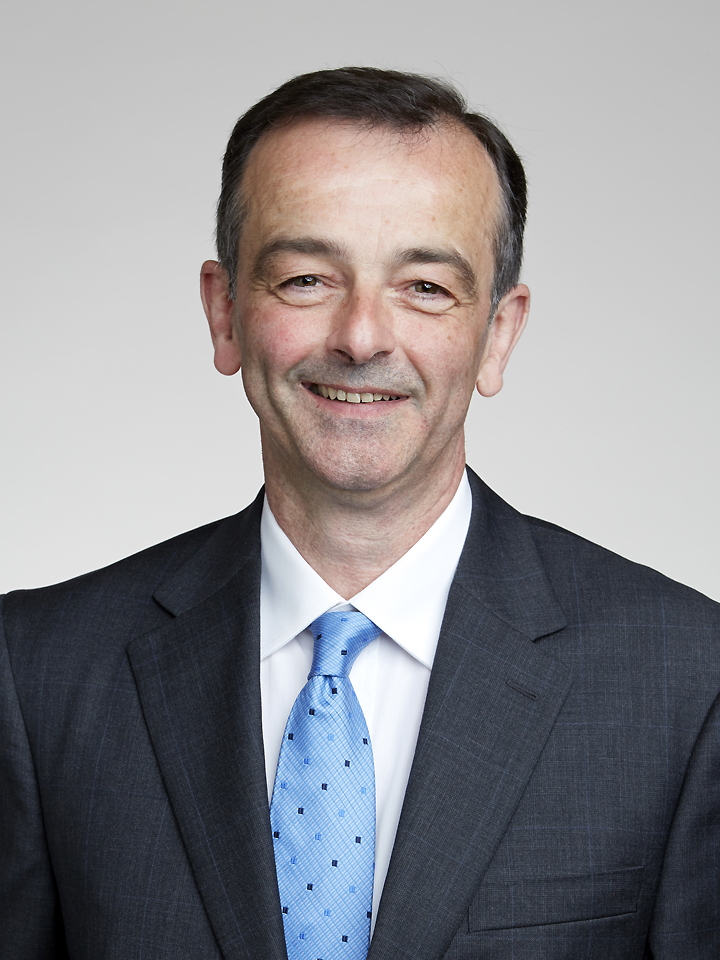
- Martin Bridson in 2016
- Born: Martin Robert Bridson; 22 October 1964 (age 62); Douglas, Isle of Man
- Education: St Ninian's High School, Douglas; University of Oxford; Cornell University
- Awards: Steele Prize (2020); Royal Society Wolfson Research Merit Award (2012); Whitehead Prize (1999)
- Scientific career
- Fields: Geometric group theory
- Workplaces: Clay Mathematics Institute; University of Oxford; Imperial College London; Princeton University
- Thesis: Geodesics and Curvature in Metric Simplicial Complexes (1991)
- Doctoral advisor: Karen Vogtmann
- Doctoral students: Daniel Wise
- Website: people.maths.ox.ac.uk/bridson

Martin Robert Bridson FRS MAE (born 22 October 1964) is a mathematician and Whitehead professor of pure mathematics at the University of Oxford and the president of the Clay Mathematics Institute. He previously served as the head of the Mathematical Institute, University of Oxford. He is a fellow of Magdalen College, Oxford and an honorary fellow of Hertford College, Oxford. Specializing in geometry, topology and group theory, Bridson is best known for his work in geometric group theory.

== Education and early life ==
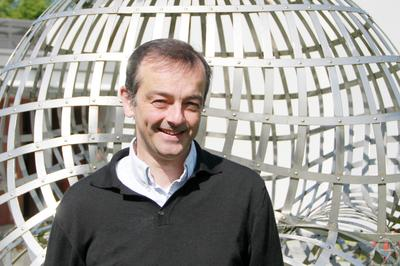
Bridson at Oberwolfach in 2013

Bridson is a native of the Isle of Man. He was educated at St Ninian's High School, Douglas, and the University of Oxford where he was an undergraduate student at Hertford College, Oxford receiving a Master of Arts (MA) degree in 1986. He moved to Cornell University for postgraduate study, gaining a Master of Science (MSc) degree in 1988 followed by a PhD in 1991 with a thesis supervised by Karen Vogtmann on geodesics and curvature in metric simplicial complexes.

== Career and research ==
Bridson served as an assistant professor at Princeton University until 1996, was twice a visiting professor at the University of Geneva (1992 and 2006), and was Professor of Mathematics at Imperial College London from 2002 to 2007. From 1993 to 2002 he served as a tutorial fellow at Pembroke College, Oxford, and Reader (1996) then Professor of Topology (2000) at the University of Oxford. He is a Supernumerary Fellow of Pembroke College. In 2016, Bridson became only the second Manx person to be elected a Fellow of the Royal Society (FRS), after Edward Forbes. In 2020, he was elected a Member of Academia Europaea (MAE). With André Haefliger, he won the 2020 Steele Prize for Mathematical Exposition for their book Metric Spaces of Non-positive Curvature, published in 1999.

=== Honours and awards ===
Bridson's awards and honours include

- 1999: awarded Whitehead Prize by the London Mathematical Society
- 2006: invited lecturer at the International Congress of Mathematicians
- 2012 Royal Society Wolfson Research Merit Award
- 2014: elected a Fellow of the American Mathematical Society
- 2016: elected a Fellow of the Royal Society (FRS)
- 2020: elected Member of Academia Europaea (MAE)
- 2020: awarded Steele Prize of the American Mathematical Society
