= Shmuel Friedland =

Israeli-American mathematician (born 1944)

- שמואל פרידלנד
- Born: 1944 (age 81–82); Tashkent
- Education: Technion - Israeli Institute of Technology
- Occupation: Mathematician

Shmuel Friedland (Hebrew: שמואל פרידלנד; born 1944 in Tashkent, Uzbek Soviet Socialist Republic) is an Israeli-American mathematician.

Friedland studied at the Technion – Israel Institute of Technology, graduating in 1967 with bachelor's degree and in 1971 with doctorate of science under the supervision of Binjamin Schwarz. As a postdoc Friedland was in 1972/73 at the Weizmann Institute, in 1973/74 at Stanford University, and in 1974/75 at the Institute for Advanced Study. Then he taught at the Hebrew University of Jerusalem, where he became in 1982 a full professor. In 1985 he became a professor at the University of Illinois at Chicago.

Besides linear algebra (matrix theory), Friedland does research on a wide variety of mathematics, including complex dynamics and applied mathematics. With Elizabeth Gross, he proved a set-theoretic version of the salmon conjecture posed by Elizabeth S. Allman.

With Miroslav Fiedler and Israel Gohberg, Friedland shared in the first Hans Schneider Prize, awarded by the International Linear Algebra Society in 1993. He was elected a Fellow of the American Mathematical Society (Class of 2019). Also, he was selected as a 2021 SIAM Fellow, "for deep and varied contributions to mathematics, especially linear algebra, matrix theory, and matrix computations".

== Selected publications ==
- "Nonoscillation and integral inequalities", Bull. Amer. Math. Soc., vol. 80, 1974, pp. 715–717. doi:10.1090/S0002-9904-1974-13565-2
- with Samuel Karlin: "Some inequalities for the spectral radius of nonnegative matrices and applications", Duke Mathematical Journal, vol. 42, 1975, pp. 459–490. (subscription required)
- Nonoscillation, disconjugacy and integral inequalities, Memoirs Amer. Math. Soc. 176, 1976
- with Walter K. Hayman: "Eigenvalue inequalities for the Dirichlet problem on spheres and the growth of subharmonic functions", Commentarii Mathematici Helvetici 51, no. 1 (1976): 133–161. doi:10.1007/BF02568147
- "On an inverse problem for nonnegative and eventually nonnegative matrices", Israel Journal of Mathematics, vol. 29, no. 1, 1978, 43–60. doi:10.1007/BF02760401
- "A lower bound for the permanent of doubly stochastic matrices", Annals of Mathematics, vol. 110, 1979, pp. 167–176. JSTOR 1971250
- with Nimrod Moiseyev: "Association of resonance states with the incomplete spectrum of finite complex-scaled Hamiltonian matrices", Physical Review A, vol. 22, no. 2, 1980, 618–624. doi:10.1103/PhysRevA.22.618
- "Convex spectral functions", Linear and Multilinear Algebra, vol. 9, no. 4, 1981, 299–316. doi:10.1080/03081088108817381
- with Carl R. de Boor and Allan Pincus: "Inverses of infinite sign regular matrices", Trans. Amer. Math. Soc., vol. 274, 1982, pp. 59–68. doi:10.1090/S0002-9947-1982-0670918-7
- "Simultaneous similarity of matrices", Bull. Amer. Math. Soc., vol. 8, 1983, pp. 93–95. doi:10.1090/S0273-0979-1983-15094-2
- "Simultaneous similarity of matrices", Advances in Mathematics, vol. 50, 1983, pp. 189–265. doi:10.1016/0001-8708(83)90044-0
- with Joel W. Robbin and John H. Sylvester: "On the crossing rule", Communications in Pure and Applied Mathematics, vol. 37, 1984, pp. 19–37. doi:10.1002/cpa.3160370104
- with Noga Alon and Gil Kalai: "Regular subgraphs of almost regular graphs", Journal of Combinatorial Theory, Series B, vol. 37, no. 1, 1984, 79–91. doi:10.1016/0095-8956(84)90047-9
- with John Willard Milnor: "Dynamical properties of plane polynomial automorphisms", Journal of Ergodic Theory & Dynamical Systems, vol. 9, 1989, pp. 67–99. doi:10.1017/S014338570000482X
- "Entropy of polynomial and rational maps", Annals of Mathematics, vol. 133, 1991, pp. 359–368. JSTOR 2944341
- with Sa'ar Hersonsky: "Jorgensen's inequality for discrete groups in normed algebras", Duke Mathematical Journal, vol. 69, 1993, pp. 593–614. (subscription required)
- with Vlad Gheorghiu and Gilad Gour: "Universal uncertainty relations", Physical Review Letters, vol. 111, 2013, p. 230401 doi:10.1103/PhysRevLett.111.230401
- with Stéphane Gaubert and Lixing Han: "Perron–Frobenius theorem for nonnegative multilinear forms and extensions", Linear Algebra and its Applications, vol. 438, no. 2, 2013, pp. 738–749. doi:10.1016/j.laa.2011.02.042
- with Giorgio Ottaviani: "The number of singular vector tuples and uniqueness of best rank one approximation of tensors", Foundations of Computational Mathematics, vol. 14, 2014, pp. 1209–1242. doi:10.1007/s10208-014-9194-z
- Matrices: Algebra, Analysis and Applications, World Scientific 2015
- with Lek-Heng Lim: "The computational complexity of duality", SIAM Journal on Optimization, vol. 26, no. 4, 2016, 2378–2393. doi:10.1137/16M105887X
- with Jinjie Zhang and Lek-Heng Lim: "Grothendieck constant is norm of Strassen matrix multiplication tensor", arXiv preprint arXiv:1711.04427, 2017. (See Grothendieck inequality.)
- with Mohsen Aliabadi, Linear Algebra and Matrices, SIAM 2018
- with Mohsen Aliabadi, Analysis and Probability on Graphs, De Gruyter, 2025
