= International Linear Algebra Society =

Professional mathematical society

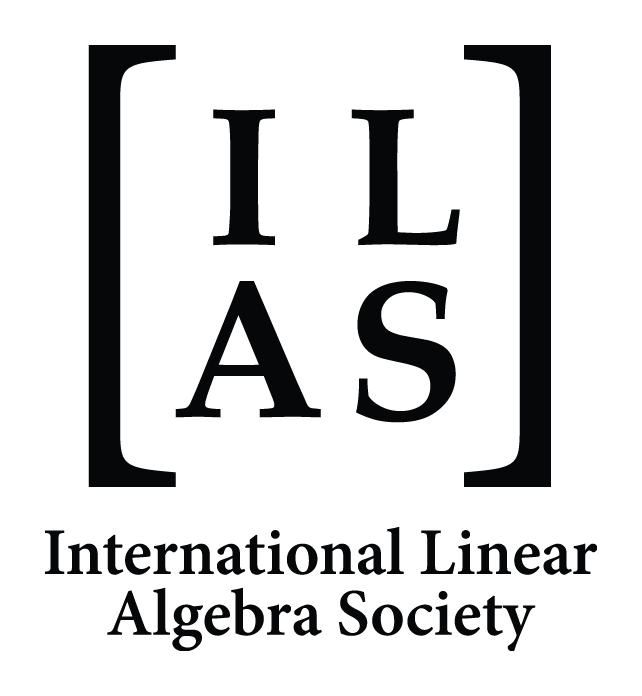
- Formation: 1989; 37 years ago
- Type: 501(c)(3)
- President: Shaun Fallat
- Publication: Electronic Journal of Linear Algebra (ELA)
- Website: ilasic.org

The International Linear Algebra Society (ILAS) is a professional mathematical society organized to promote research and education in linear algebra, matrix theory and matrix computation. It serves the international community through conferences, publications, prizes and lectures. Membership in ILAS is open to all mathematicians and scientists interested in furthering its aims and participating in its activities.

== History ==
ILAS was founded in 1989. Its genesis occurred at the Combinatorial Matrix Analysis Conference held at the University of Victoria in British Columbia, Canada, May 20–23, 1987, hosted by Dale Olesky and Pauline van den Driessche. ILAS was initially known as the International Matrix Group, founded in 1987. The founding officers of ILAS were Hans Schneider, President; Robert C. Thompson, Vice President; Daniel Hershkowitz, Secretary; and James R. Weaver, Treasurer.

== ILAS Conferences ==
The inaugural meeting of ILAS took place at Brigham Young University (including one day at the Sundance Mountain Resort) in Provo, Utah, USA, from August 12–15, 1989. The organizing committee consisted of Wayne Barrett, Daniel Hershkowitz, Charles Johnson, Hans Schneider, and Robert C. Thompson. Much additional support came from Don Robinson, Chair of the BYU Mathematics Department, and James R. Weaver, ILAS Treasurer. The conference received support from Brigham Young University, the National Security Agency, and the National Science Foundation. There were 85 in attendance at the conference from 15 countries including Olga Taussky-Todd, a renowned mathematician in Matrix Theory. The proceedings of the Conference appeared in volume 150 of the journal Linear Algebra and Its Applications.

The 2nd ILAS conference was held in Lisbon, Portugal, August 3–7, 1992. The chair of the organizing committee was José Dias da Silva. There were 150 participants from 27 countries and the conference was supported by 11 different organizations. The proceedings of the conference can be found in volumes 197–198 of Linear Algebra and Its Applications.

ILAS conferences were held the next 4 years, alternating between the United States and Europe, before beginning the standard pattern of holding the Conference two of every three years (with a few exceptions). The number of participants at each ILAS conference has grown steadily through the years.

The first ILAS conference outside of the United States and Europe was held in Haifa, Israel in 2001. The first in the Far East was in Shanghai in 2007 and the first in Latin America was in Cancun, Mexico in 2008. The complete list of locations hosting ILAS conferences follows:

1. (United States) Provo, Utah, USA (1989)

2. Lisbon, Portugal (1992)

3. (United States) Pensacola, Florida, USA (1993)

4. Rotterdam, The Netherlands (1994)

5. (United States) Atlanta, Georgia, USA (1995)

6. Chemnitz, Germany (1996)

7. (United States) Madison, Wisconsin, USA (1998)

8. Barcelona, Spain (1999)

9. Haifa, Israel (2001)

10. (United States) Auburn, Alabama, USA (2002)

11. Coimbra, Portugal (2004)

12. Regina, Saskatchewan, Canada (2005)

13. Amsterdam, the Netherlands (2006)

14. Shanghai, China (2007)

15. Cancun, Mexico (2008)

16. Pisa, Italy (2010)

17. Braunschweig, Germany (2011)

18. (United States) Providence, Rhode Island, USA (2013)

19. Seoul, Korea (2014)

20. Leuven, Belgium (2016)

21. (United States) Ames, Iowa, USA (2017)

22. Rio de Janeiro, Brazil (2019)

23. (United States) Virtual (originally planned for New Orleans, Louisiana, USA) (2021)

24. (Republic of Ireland) Galway, Ireland (2022)

25. Madrid, Spain (2023)

26. Kaohsiung, Taiwan (2025)

27. (United States) Blacksburg, Virginia, USA (2026)

28. Budapest, Hungary (2028)

== Prizes and Special Lectures ==
ILAS has three prizes named after giants in Linear Algebra.

- The Hans Schneider Prize. A distinctive feature of the 3rd ILAS meeting held at the University of West Florida in Pensacola, Florida, March 17–20, 1993, was the institution of the Hans Schneider Prize. This prize was initiated thanks to a donation to ILAS from Hans Schneider, the first president of ILAS and a founding editor of the journal Linear Algebra and Its Applications. Typically, the prize is awarded every 3 years and has evolved as a prize to recognize a person's career.
- The ILAS Olga Taussky and John Todd Prize. Olga Taussky-Todd and John Todd have had a decisive impact on the development of theoretical and numerical linear algebra for over half a century. The ILAS Olga Taussky and John Todd Prize honors them for their many and varied mathematical achievements and for their efforts in promoting linear algebra and matrix theory. The prize is awarded once every three to four years recognizing a linear algebra researcher in their mid career. The ILAS Olga Taussky and John Todd Prize was originally referred to as the Taussky–Todd lecture, and was instituted at the 3rd ILAS meeting held at the University of West Florida in Pensacola, Florida, March 17–20, 1993.
- The ILAS Richard A. Brualdi Early Career Prize. The prize is named for Richard A. Brualdi, who has had a major impact on the field, especially in combinatorial matrix theory. In addition, he has been instrumental to the success of ILAS since its inception. The ILAS Richard A. Brualdi Early Career Prize was instituted in 2021 and is awarded every three years to an outstanding early career researcher in the field of linear algebra, for distinguished contributions to the field.

In addition ILAS awards Special Lectures at ILAS conferences as well as conferences of collaborating mathematics organizations.

== Publications ==
ILAS publishes an electronic journal – the Electronic Journal of Linear Algebra (ELA), founded in 1996. The first Editors-in-Chief were Volker Mehrmann and Daniel Hershkowitz. ELA is a platinum open access journal, meaning that it is free to all: no subscription and no article processing fee or page charges. ELA is an all-electronic journal that welcomes high quality mathematical articles that contribute new insights to matrix analysis and the various aspects of linear algebra and its applications. ELA sets high standards for refereeing while using conventional refereeing of articles that is carried out electronically.

ILAS also produces and distributes IMAGE, a semiannual electronic bulletin founded in 1988 with Robert C. Thompson as its first Editor. IMAGE contains: essays related to linear algebra activities; feature articles; interviews of linear algebra experts; book reviews; brief reports on conferences; ILAS business notices; announcements of upcoming workshops and conferences; problems and solutions; and news about individual members.

== Presidents ==
Hans Schneider, 1987–1996

Richard A. Brualdi, 1996–2002

Daniel Hershkowitz, 2002–2008

Stephen Kirkland, 2008–2014

Peter Šemrl, 2014–2020

Daniel B. Szyld, 2020–2026

Shaun Fallat, 2026-present

== Collaborations with other mathematics organizations ==
ILAS collaborates with the Society for Industrial and Applied Mathematics (SIAM), the American Mathematical Society (AMS) and the International Workshop on Operator Theory and its Applications (IWOTA).

The collaboration with SIAM started in 1999. The SIAM Activity Group on Linear Algebra (SIAG/LA) holds a conference every three years (when the year minus 2000 is divisible by 3). As part of the agreement, and to encourage interaction between ILAS and SIAG/LA members, the two societies do not hold conferences in the same year. As a result, ILAS holds conferences two out of every three years. In addition, the two societies exchange speakers with ILAS sponsoring two ILAS speakers at every triennial SIAM Applied Linear Algebra (SIAM ALA) meeting (organized by SIAG/LA) and with SIAM sponsoring a SIAM speaker at every ILAS conference. The first ILAS speakers at a SIAM ALA meeting were Hans Schneider and Hugo Woerdeman in 2000, and the first SIAM speakers at an ILAS conference were Michele Benzi and Misha Kilmer in 2002.

The collaboration with AMS started in late 2020 with the establishment of ILAS as a partner in the Joint Mathematics Meetings (JMM). In this capacity ILAS will support a speaker for the "ILAS Lecture" at the JMM to be selected by ILAS. In addition, at least four special sessions at the JMM will be identified as ILAS special sessions, the contents of which will be determined by ILAS. The partnership took effect starting with the JMM 2022 held virtually.

The collaboration with IWOTA started in 2017 with the establishment of the Israel Gohberg ILAS-IWOTA Lecture, which is funded by donations. This lecture series consists of biennial lectures either at an ILAS conference or at an IWOTA meeting. Israel Gohberg was the founding president of IWOTA and an active member of ILAS. The first Israel Gohberg ILAS-IWOTA Lecturer was Vern Paulsen at the 2021 IWOTA Lancaster UK meeting.
