= Joseph Ball =

Joseph or Joe Ball may refer to:

- Joseph Ball (Virginia public servant) (1649–1711), English-born justice, vestryman, lieutenant colonel, and Burgess in the Colony of Virginia
- Joseph T. Ball (1804–1861), African-American Latter Day Saint
- Joseph Lancaster Ball (1852–1933), English architect
- Joseph Henry Ball (1861–1931), British architect
- Joe Ball (footballer, born 1882) (1882–1918), English footballer for Chesterfield Town and Bury, see List of Bury F.C. players (1–24 appearances)
- Sir Joseph Ball (British public servant) (1885–1961), British intelligence officer, administrator, barrister, and industrialist
- Joseph A. Ball (inventor) (1894–1951), American inventor, physicist and executive at Technicolor
- Joe Ball (1896–1938), American serial killer
- Joseph H. Ball (1905–1993), American journalist, U.S. Senator from Minnesota, and businessman
- Joe Ball (rugby league) (1927–1964), English rugby league footballer
- Joe Ball (footballer) (1931–1974), English football winger
- Joseph A. Ball (mathematician) (born 1947), American mathematician
