= Daniel B. Szyld =

Argentinian-American applied mathematician

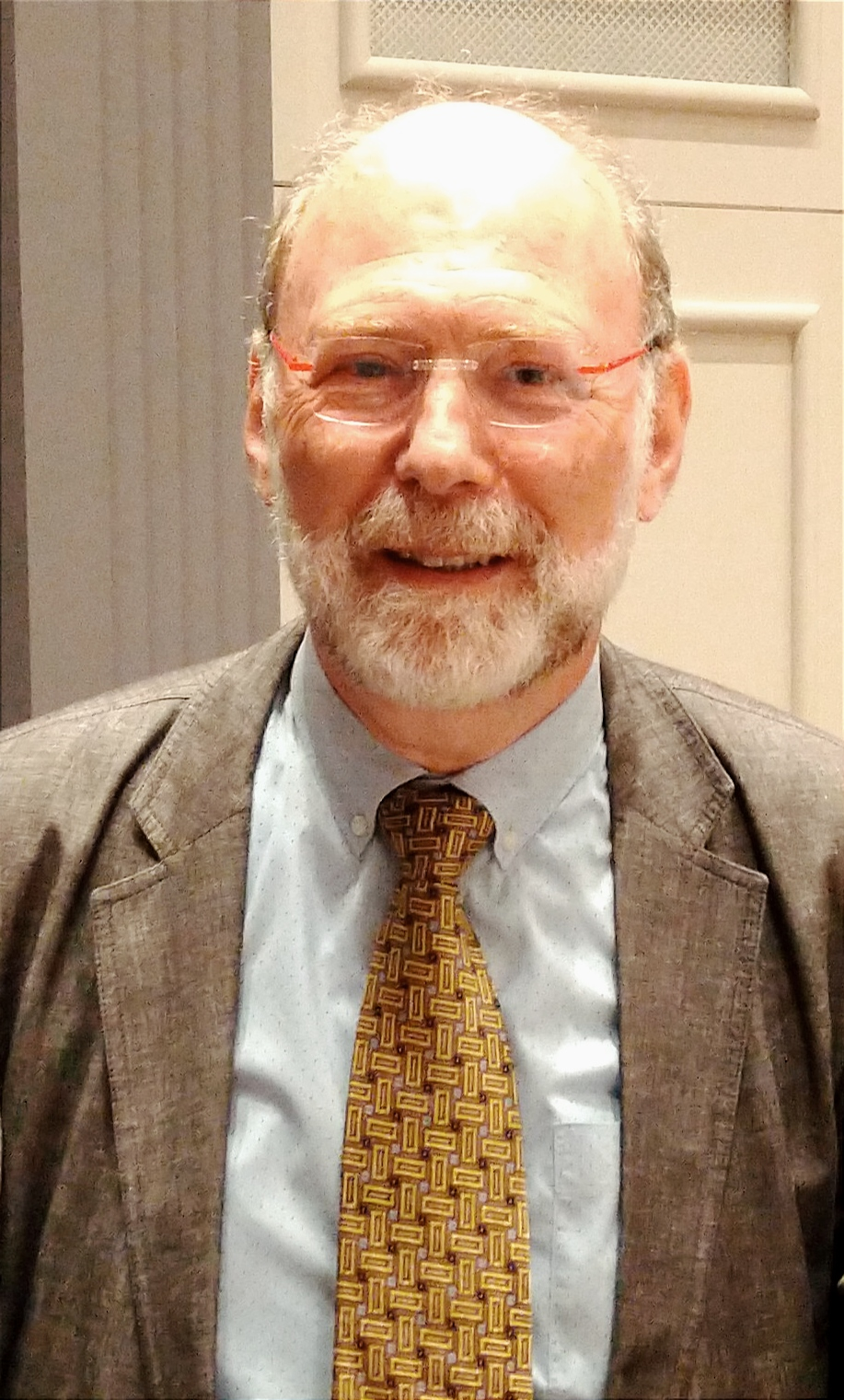
- Born: 1955 (age 70–71); Buenos Aires
- Awards: SIAM Fellow, Fellow of the American Mathematical Society

Academic background
- Education: Universidad de Buenos Aires
- Alma mater: Courant Institute, New York University
- Thesis: A Two-level Iterative Method for Large Sparse Generalized Eigenvalue Calculations (1983)
- Doctoral advisor: Olof B. Widlund.

Academic work
- Discipline: Computational mathematics
- Sub-discipline: Numerical linear algebra
- Institutions: Temple University
- Website: https://www.math.temple.edu/~szyld/

Daniel B. Szyld (born 1955 in Buenos Aires) is an Argentinian and American mathematician who is a professor at Temple University in Philadelphia. He has made contributions to numerical and applied linear algebra as well as matrix theory.

== Education ==
He was admitted without an undergraduate degree to the graduate school at New York University, where he defended his PhD in 1983. While there, he worked as a research assistant for Wassily Leontief.

== International awards and appointments ==
He was named as a SIAM Fellow and as a fellow of the American Mathematical Society in 2017. In 2020, he was elected president of the International Linear Algebra Society. He was editor-in-chief for the Electronic Transactions on Numerical Analysis from 2005 to 2013 and SIAM Journal on Matrix Analysis and Applications from 2015 to 2020 and is on the editorial boards of several journals, including the Electronic Journal of Linear Algebra (ELA), the Electronic Transactions on Numerical Analysis (ETNA), Linear Algebra and its Applications, Mathematics of Computation, Numerical Linear Algebra with Applications, and Journal of Numerical Analysis and Approximation Theory. A conference in honor of his 65th birthday was held in 2022

== Books and edited proceedings ==
- Klapper, Isaac; Szyld, Daniel B.; Zhao, Kai (2021). Metabolic Networks, Elementary Flux Modes, and Polyhedral Cones. Philadelphia: Other Titles in Applied Mathematics series, vol. 171, SIAM. doi:10.1137/1.9781611976533. ISBN 978-1-61197-652-6. MR 4279642. S2CID 237914557.
- Brenner, Susanne C.; Shparlinski, Igor; Shu, Chi-Wang; Szyld, Daniel B. (2020). 75 Years of Mathematics of Computation. Contemporary Mathematics. Vol. 754. Providence, R.I.: Contemporary Mathematics series vol. 754, American Mathematical Society. doi:10.1090/conm/754. ISBN 9781470451639. MR 4132114. S2CID 226239867.

== Selected papers ==
- Leontief, Wassily; Duchin, Faye; Szyld, Daniel B. (1985). "New Approaches in Economic Analysis". Science. 228 (4698): 419–422. Bibcode:1985Sci...228..419L. doi:10.1126/science.228.4698.419. PMID 17746871. S2CID 40269573.
- Benzi, Michele; Szyld, Daniel B.; van Duin, Arno (1999). "Orderings for Incomplete Factorization Preconditioning of Nonsymmetric Problems". SIAM Journal on Scientific Computing. 20 (5): 1652–1670. Bibcode:1999SJSC...20.1652B. doi:10.1137/S1064827597326845. MR 1694677.
- Frommer, Andreas; Szyld, Daniel B. (2000). "On Asynchronous Iterations". Journal of Computational and Applied Mathematics. 123 (1–2): 201–216. Bibcode:2000JCoAM.123..201F. doi:10.1016/S0377-0427(00)00409-X. MR 1798526.
- Frommer, Andreas; Szyld, Daniel B. (2001). "An Algebraic Convergence Theory for Restricted Additive Schwarz Methods Using Weighted Max Norms". SIAM Journal on Numerical Analysis. 39 (2): 463–479. doi:10.1137/S0036142900370824. MR 1860268.
- Simoncini, Valeria; Szyld, Daniel B. (2003). "Theory of Inexact Krylov Subspace Methods and Applications to Scientific Computing". SIAM Journal on Scientific Computing. 25 (2): 454–477. Bibcode:2003SJSC...25..454S. doi:10.1137/S1064827502406415. MR 2058070.
- Simoncini, Valeria; Szyld, Daniel B. (2005). "On the Occurrence of Superlinear convergence of exact and inexact Krylov subspace methods". SIAM Review. 47 (2): 247–272. Bibcode:2005SIAMR..47..247S. doi:10.1137/S0036144503424439. MR 2179897.
- Simoncini, Valeria; Szyld, Daniel B. (2007). "Recent computational developments in Krylov Subspace Methods for linear systems". Numerical Linear Algebra with Applications. 14: 1–59. doi:10.1002/nla.499. MR 2289520. S2CID 4012149.
