= Stefan Güttel =

German numerical analyst and professor

- Born: Stefan Dietrich Güttel; 27 November 1981 (age 44); Dresden, Germany
- Citizenship: Germany
- Education: Freiberg University of Mining and Technology
- Awards: James H. Wilkinson Prize in Numerical Analysis and Scientific Computing (2021); ILAS Taussky–Todd Prize (2023); SIAM Fellow (2026)
- Scientific career
- Fields: Mathematics; Numerical analysis; Numerical linear algebra; Mathematical software
- Workplaces: University of Manchester
- Thesis: Rational Krylov Methods for Operator Functions (2010)
- Doctoral advisor: Michael Eiermann
- Website: www.guettel.com

Stefan Dietrich Güttel (born 27 November 1981) is a German numerical analyst. He is Professor of Applied Mathematics in the Department of Mathematics at the University of Manchester.

Güttel was born in Dresden, and was educated at the Freiberg University of Mining and Technology, from which he gained his MSc in Applied Mathematics (2006) and PhD in Applied Mathematics (2010). His PhD thesis Rational Krylov Methods for Operator Functions was supervised by Michael Eiermann. He worked as a postdoctoral researcher at the University of Geneva (2010–2011) and the University of Oxford (2011–2012). In 2012 he was appointed lecturer in mathematics at the University of Manchester, and later promoted to Senior Lecturer and Reader. In 2021 he was promoted to Professor of Applied Mathematics.

Güttel is best known for his work on numerical algorithms for large-scale problems arising with differential equations and in data science, in particular Krylov subspace methods. He worked with companies such as Intel, Schlumberger, and Arup.

Since 2018 Güttel is a Fellow of the Alan Turing Institute, the United Kingdom's national institute for data science and artificial intelligence. In 2018 he received a Teaching Excellence Award of the University of Manchester. In 2021 he was awarded the James H. Wilkinson Prize in Numerical Analysis and Scientific Computing by the Society for Industrial and Applied Mathematics (SIAM) for his contributions to the analysis, implementation, and application of rational and block Krylov methods (laudatio), which have become popular for the efficient numerical solution of large eigenvalue problems, matrix equations, and in model order reduction. In 2023 he received the Taussky–Todd Prize of the International Linear Algebra Society. In 2026 he was elected a SIAM Fellow.

Güttel has served as the elected Secretary and Treasurer of the UK and Republic of Ireland section of SIAM (2016–2018) and is a member of SIAM's membership committee (since 2020). He served on the editorial boards of the SIAM Journal on Scientific Computing (2015–2021) and Electronic Transactions on Numerical Analysis (since 2020).
