= Electronic Journal of Linear Algebra =

- Discipline: Mathematics
- Language: English
- Edited by: Vanni Noferini

Publication details
- History: 1996–present
- Publisher: International Linear Algebra Society
- Frequency: Annually
- Open access: Yes
- Impact factor: 0.8 (2024)

Standard abbreviations
- ISO 4: Electron. J. Linear Algebra

Indexing
- ISSN: 1081-3810
- LCCN: 2001207077
- OCLC no.: 890352495

Links
- Journal homepage; Online access; Online archive

The Electronic Journal of Linear Algebra is a peer-reviewed platinum open access scientific journal covering matrix analysis and linear algebra, together with their applications. It is published by the International Linear Algebra Society and its editor-in-chief is Vanni Noferini (Aalto University).

== Editors-in-chief ==
The first editors-in-chief were Volker Mehrmann (Technische Universität Berlin; 1996–1999) and Daniel Hershkowitz (Bar-Ilan University; 1996–2010). Other former editors-in-chief are Ludwig Elsner (Bielefeld University; 2010–2011), Bryan Shader (University of Wyoming; 2010–2019), Michael Tsatsomeros (Washington State University; 2016–2022), and Froilán M. Dopico (Universidad Carlos III de Madrid; 2019-2025). The current editor-in-chief is Vanni Noferini (Aalto University; since 2025).

== Abstracting and indexing ==
The journal is abstracted and indexed in:

- Current Contents/Physical, Chemical & Earth Sciences
- Mathematical Reviews
- Science Citation Index Expanded
- Scopus
- Zentralblatt MATH

According to the Journal Citation Reports, the journal has a 2024 impact factor of 0.8.
