= Rokne =

Rokne is a surname. Notable people with the surname include:

- Jon George Rokne, Canadian engineer
- Marianne Rokne (born 1978), Norwegian handballer
