= Kaashoek =

Kaashoek is a surname. Notable people with the surname include:

- Frans Kaashoek (born 1965), Dutch mathematician and computer scientist
- Rien Kaashoek (1937–2024), Dutch mathematician
