= Hans Schneider Prize in Linear Algebra =

Mathematical prize

- Description: Research, contributions, or service at the highest level of linear algebra
- Country: International
- Presented by: International Linear Algebra Society (ILAS)
- Rewards: Certificate and a cash prize
- Status: Active
- Website: www.ilasic.org/misc/schneider.html

The Hans Schneider Prize in Linear Algebra is awarded every three years by the International Linear Algebra Society. It recognizes research, contributions, and achievements at the highest level of linear algebra and was first awarded in 1993. It may be awarded for an outstanding scientific achievement or for lifetime contributions and may be awarded to more than one recipient. The award honors Hans Schneider, "one of the most influential mathematicians of the 20th Century in the field of linear algebra and matrix analysis.” The prize includes a plaque, certificate and/or a monetary award.

== Recipients ==
The recipients of the Hans Schneider Prize in Linear Algebra are:

- 1993: Miroslav Fiedler
- 1993: Shmuel Friedland
- 1993: Israel Gohberg
- 1996: Mike Boyle
- 1996: David Handelman
- 1996: Robert C. Thompson
- 1999: Ludwig Elsner
- 2002: Tsuyoshi Ando
- 2002: Peter Lancaster
- 2005: Richard A. Brualdi
- 2005: Richard S. Varga
- 2010: Cleve Moler
- 2010: Beresford Parlett
- 2013: Thomas J. Laffey
- 2016: Rajendra Bhatia
- 2016: Paul Van Dooren
- 2019: Lek-Heng Lim
- 2019: Volker Mehrmann
- 2022: Pauline van den Driessche
- 2022: Nicholas Higham
- 2025: Chi-Kwong Li
- 2025: Dario Bini

== See also ==
- List of mathematics awards
