= Hans Schneider (mathematician) =

American mathematician

Hans Schneider (24 January 1927 – 28 October 2014) was a British-American mathematician, and James Joseph Sylvester Emeritus Professor at the University of Wisconsin–Madison. He was the first president of the International Matrix Group (1987–1990) and its successor, the International Linear Algebra Society (1990 – 1996), which established the triennial Hans Schneider Prize in 1993. Schneider was a founding editor (1968–1972) and then editor-in-chief of Linear Algebra and Its Applications (1972 – 2012) and an Advisory Editor of the Electronic Journal of Linear Algebra.

He received his Ph.D. from the University of Edinburgh in 1952; his advisor was Alexander Craig Aitken. Following his doctorate, he taught at the Queen's University of Belfast until 1959, when he moved to the University of Wisconsin. He retired in 1993. He was the author of over 160 research papers. His research covered many topics in linear algebra, such as Perron Frobenius theory and related topics, inertia theory. and lately max algebra. For his experiences in the years 1938 – 1940 see the Kindertransport site.

Schneider died of cancer at the age of 87. He was the grandfather of YouTube musician / producer Kurt Hugo Schneider.
