= Reichl =

Reichl is a surname, a variant spelling of Reichel. People with this surname include:

- Fritz Reichl (1890–1959), Austrian architect
- Linda Reichl (born 1942), American physicist
- Michal Reichl (born 1992), Czech footballer
- Ruth Reichl (born 1948), American chef and food writer
- Sebastian Reichl, guitarist for German metal band Deadlock (band)
- Udo Reichl (born 1959), German bioengineer
