= The Lords (German band) =

German band

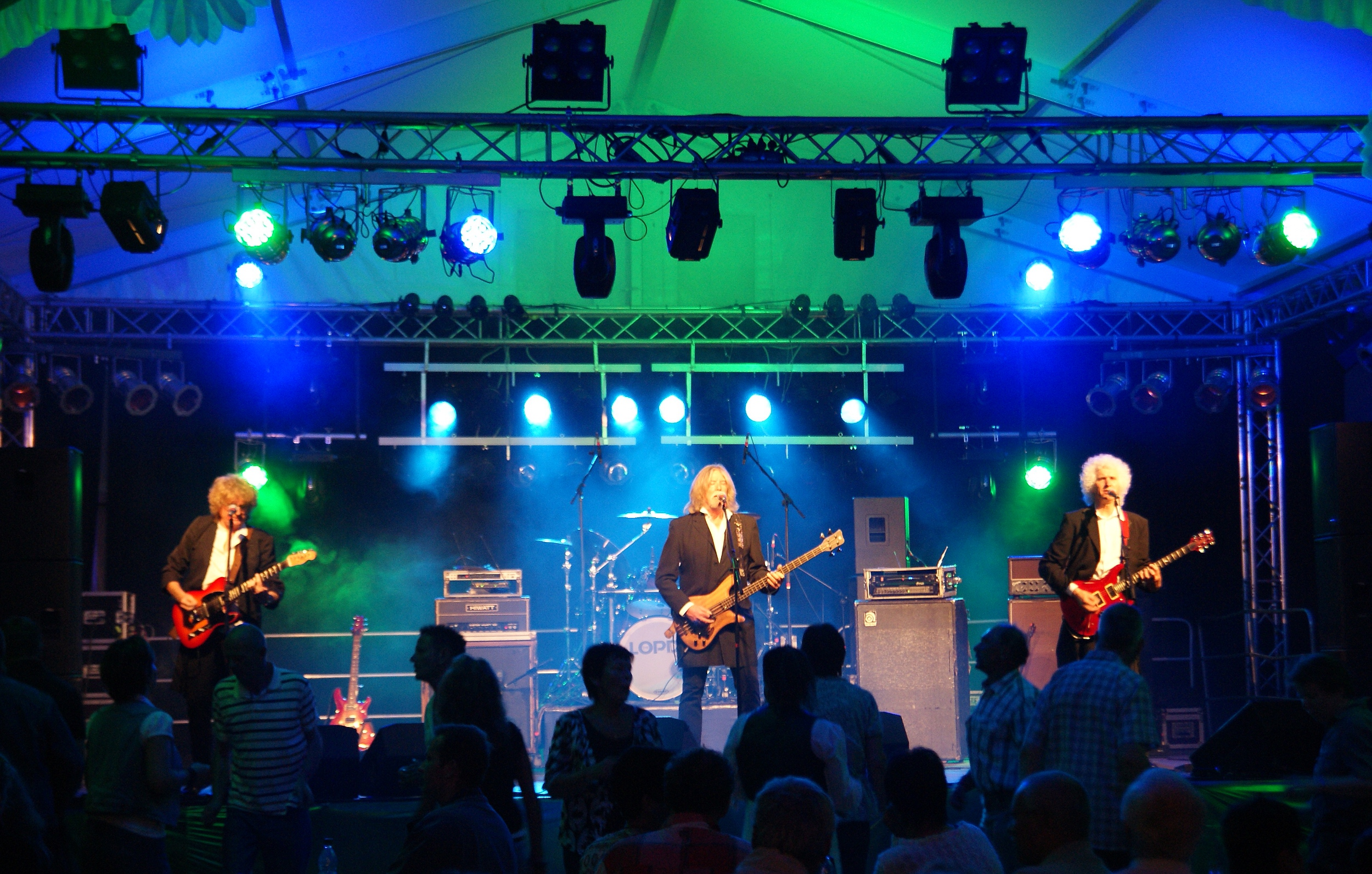
- The Lords performing in Großolbersdorf in 2011

Background information
- Origin: Berlin, Germany
- Genres: Rock; beat
- Years active: 1959–1971; 1976–present
- Labels: Columbia; Repertoire
- Members: Norbert Barton; Philippe Seminara; Jupp Bauer; Roger Schüller
- Past members: Knud Kuntze; Ulli Günther; Werner Faus; Rainer Petry; Charly Terstappen; Peter "Max" Donath; Bernd Zamulo; Leo Lietz
- Website: thelords.de

The Lords are a German beat and rock band formed in Berlin in 1959. They are one of the longest-running beat groups from Germany, spanning the last half century. They are best known for their work during the sixties and early seventies and are noted for their sometimes humorous and irreverent approach.

Between 1965 and 1969, the Lords had twelve titles on the German charts, mainly produced by Heinz Gietz. Their biggest hit was the classic, "Gloryland", from September 1967, which reached number 5,. Their last success was "Three-Five-Zero-Zero" in August 1969. By 1989, The Lords had released over thirty singles and had achieved sales of seven million copies, a record for a German rock band in their own country.

== History ==
=== 1959–1971: Classic period ===
In 1959, The Lords started out as a skiffle band in Berlin using partly homemade instruments. In 1964 when Beatlemania and the British Invasion swept across the world, they turned into "Germany's First Beat Music Act" and developed their classic style for which they are still known in Germany today. On 23 July 1964, the Beatles film A Hard Day's Night appeared in the German cinemas, titled Yeah Yeah Yeah. Before the premiere, a competition was held, with the "Berliner Beatles" being sought. From this competition the Lords emerged as the winner on 21 July 1964. Therefore, they were eligible to participate in the nationwide finals at the Hamburg Star Club. On 6 September 1964, the Lords won here too, and were named "Germany's Beat Band No. 1". In late 1964 the band received a recording contract from EMI in Cologne and were now marketed as the German Beatles. In 1964, their bassist Knud Kuntze ("Lord Knud") (18 March 1944 – 14 June 2020) had to leave the band due to an accident in which he lost his leg. He then started a career in radio, becoming a prominent DJ at the radio station, RIAS.

In 1965, the Lords' band's roster changed to what most fans consider to be their classic line-up. It would consist of Ulli Günther (vocals), Bernd Zamulo (bass), Leo Lietz (guitar), Rainer Petry (guitar) and Max Donath (drums). This roster lasted until 1971, which would mark the end of what was the most successful period of the band. In the period from 1965 until 1969 they had 11 hits in West German pop charts. Their first hit single from 1964 was Shakin' All Over (originally recorded by Johnny Kidd & The Pirates in 1960). Their other hits included the original song Poor Boy in 1965 (written by Leo Lietz), Poison Ivy in 1965 (originally by The Coasters, 1959), the Baptist traditional Gloryland in 1967, and Rockin' Pneumonia in 1967 (originally by Huey "Piano" Smith, 1957). Their 1960s cover versions of Shakin' all over, Poison Ivy, and Gloryland still get much more airtime on German radio today than the originals or later recordings of these songs by English and American performers.

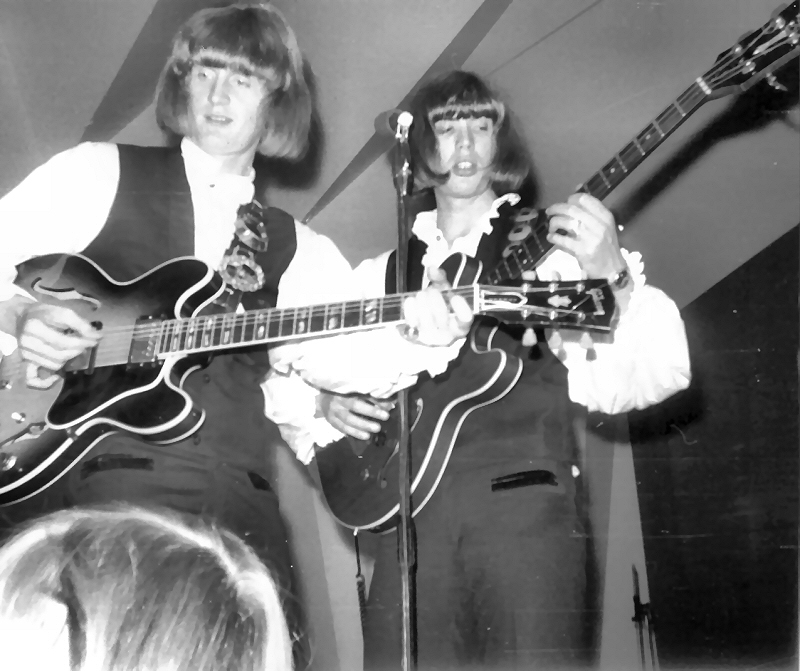
The Lords performing in 1967

They also appeared as supporting act of The Kinks and The Who on German tours of the two English bands, and performed on the contemporary TV music programme Beat-Club several times (footage from these Beat-Club performances would continue to be rerun on German TV well into the 2000s, playing an important role in shaping public perception of The Lords as a classic beat era act). In 1967 their success allowed them to make an appearance as the main band in the Legia Stadium in Warsaw in front of 25,000 spectators; they were the first western band allowed to perform in a Soviet bloc country. In 1971 the Lords broke up due to Bernd Zamulo forming Sitting Bull, but they would re-unite five years later.

=== Since 1976: Reunion ===
From 1976 onwards, The Lords have re-united on several occasions with different line-ups, mostly considered as a nostalgia live band playing their old hits at 60s festivals and on TV shows, every few years re-recording technologically updated versions of their songs. "Lord Leo" Lietz has usually acted as bandleader during these reunions, and he represents them and still gives the most interviews of all current band members.

Singer of The Lords, Lord Ulli died in a Potsdam hospital on 13 October 1999, after having a breakdown while performing on stage on 9 October 1999 during a concert of their 40 years anniversary tour. The Lords reformed in 2000. The band released two new albums, in 2002 and 2009, respectively. Knud Kuntze died on 14 June 2020, aged 76. Former bassist, Bernd (Lord Bernd) Zamulo died on 12 May 2026, aged 79.

== Style and reputation ==
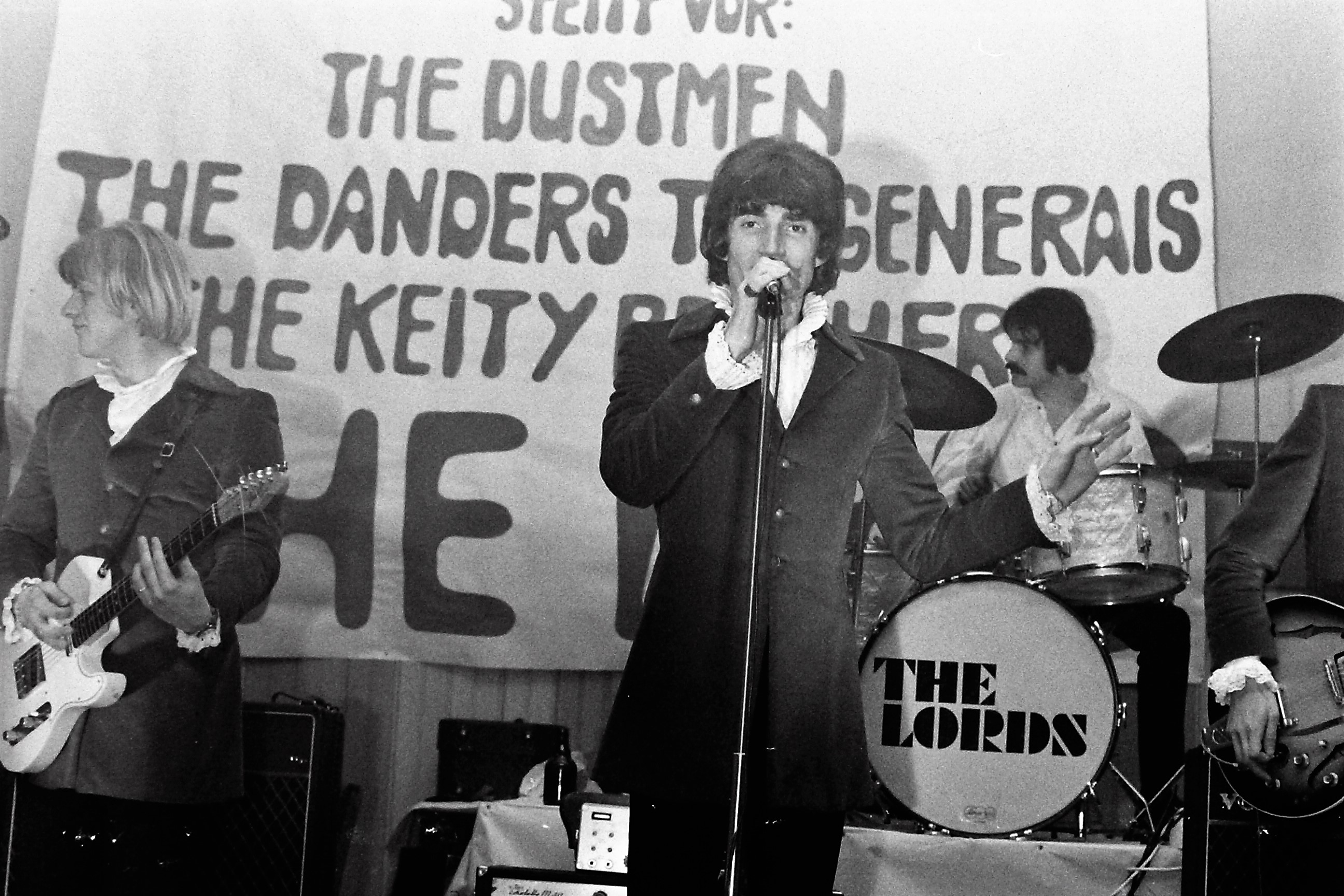
The Lords in 1968

Rather than taking the approach of a serious music band, The Lords were more of a slapstick and comedy troupe especially on stage, probably akin to bands like The Bonzo Dog Doo-Dah Band in England at the time (and indeed Johnny Kidd & The Pirates whose Shakin' All Over The Lords covered and which became their first hit single), overdoing the contemporary moptop hairstyle by making it look like a stereotypical Medieval haircut as portrayed in the modern comic Prince Valiant, taking the formal suit fashion introduced by The Beatles and turning them into waiters' clothing, and dancing like a girl group such as the 1920s Tiller Girls on stage.

This rather lighthearted attitude led to a rivalry with the more serious Hamburg-based band The Rattles and especially their bandleader and producer Achim Reichel, who was critical of the Lords for their silly antics. In addition to their clownesqueries, which were looked down upon by more ambitious proto-Krautrock artists such as Reichel, there was a rumour that singer of The Lords, Ulli Günther ("Lord Ulli") did not speak English even though it was the language he sang in, and that therefore his German accent was much thicker than was usual in the German-produced but English-sung music scene at the time.

Towards the end of the 1960s, the band was increasingly influenced by psychedelia and brought more social commentary, serious or satirical, into their lyrics, effectually turning from a British Invasion-influenced pop band into a progressive Krautrock group. However, nothing of this development, nor the slapstick approach that came before it would be evident in subsequent reunions after 1976. Instead, since their re-formation they foster more of a rough rocker and teddy boy image both in their instrumentation, arrangements, and their clothing, now appearing in jeans clothing and sunglasses, comparable to the new style 1970s glam rock band Slade took on during the 1980s, even though today The Lords often perform to recordings of their old singles when on TV while dressed up in their new style.

The original recordings of their singles, later often re-recorded by the band, were issued on CD as the double CD box The Original Singles – Collection/The A & B-Sides in 1999, beside which the CD version of their 1972 best-of album The LORDS 1964-1971 sold well, while Shakin' All Over '70 (1970) and The Very Best (1992), like most of their albums after 1971, are more recent, technologically updated re-recordings of their classic songs.

== Discography ==
- In Black and White – In Beat and Sweet (1965)
- Shakin' All Over (1966)
- Some Folks by the Lords (1967)
- Good Side of June (1968)
- Deutschlands Beatband Nr. 1 Die Volksplatte (1968)
- Ulleogamaxbe (1969)
- Shakin' All Over '70 (1970)
- Inside Out (1971)
- 1964–1971 (1971)
- Birthday Album – 15 years (1974)
- 20 Jahre Lords (1979)
- The Lords '88 (1988)
- Stormy (1989)
- The Very Best (1992)
- The Original Singles – Collection/The A & B-Sides (1999)
- Live 1999 (1999)
- Spitfire Lace (2002)
- Lords 50 (2009)
- Reloaded (2014)
- Now More Than Ever! (2015)
- Novum Nexus (2022)
