= Pauline van den Driessche =

British and Canadian applied mathematician

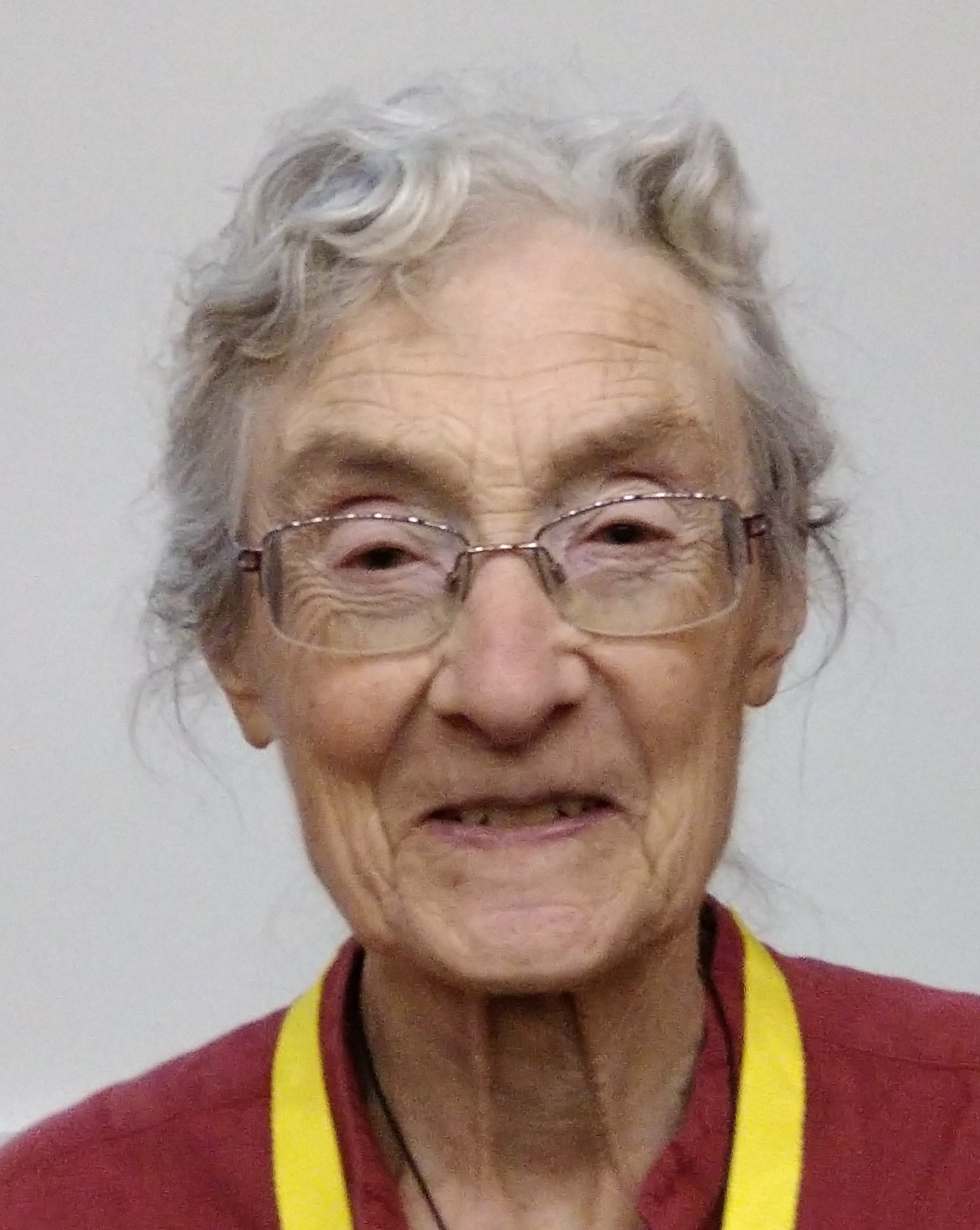
- Born: 1941 (age 84–85)
- Awards: Krieger–Nelson Prize

Academic background
- Education: Imperial College London
- Alma mater: University College of Wales

Academic work
- Discipline: Applied mathematics
- Sub-discipline: Mathematical biology
- Institutions: University of Victoria

Pauline van den Driessche (born 1941) is a British and Canadian applied mathematician who is a professor emerita in the department of mathematics and statistics at the University of Victoria, where she has also held an affiliation in the department of computer science. Her research interests include mathematical biology, matrix analysis, and stability theory.

== Education and career ==
Van den Driessche earned bachelor's and master's degrees in 1961 and 1963 respectively from Imperial College London. She completed her doctorate in 1964 from the University College of Wales; her dissertation concerned fluid mechanics. She stayed on for a year in Wales as an assistant lecturer; she was hired as an assistant professor at the University of Victoria in 1965, and retired in 2006.

== Contributions ==
In mathematical biology, van den Driessche's contributions include important work on delay differential equations and on Hopf bifurcations, and the effects of changing population size and immigration on epidemics.

She has also done more fundamental research in linear algebra, motivated by applications in mathematical biology. Her work in this area includes pioneering contributions to the theory of combinatorial matrix theory in which she proved connections between the sign pattern of a matrix and its stability, as well as results on matrix decomposition.

== Awards and honors ==
In 2005, the journal Linear Algebra and its Applications published a special issue in her honor. She was the 2007 winner of the Krieger–Nelson Prize of the Canadian Mathematical Society, and in the same year became the inaugural Olga Taussky-Todd Lecturer, an award given every four years at the International Congress on Industrial and Applied Mathematics by the International Council for Industrial and Applied Mathematics and Association for Women in Mathematics. In 2013 she became a fellow of the Society for Industrial and Applied Mathematics "for contributions to linear algebra and mathematical biology". She received the CAIMS Research Prize from the Canadian Applied and Industrial Mathematics Society in 2019, and the 2022 Hans Schneider Prize in Linear Algebra.
