= Peter Benner =

German mathematician (born 1967)

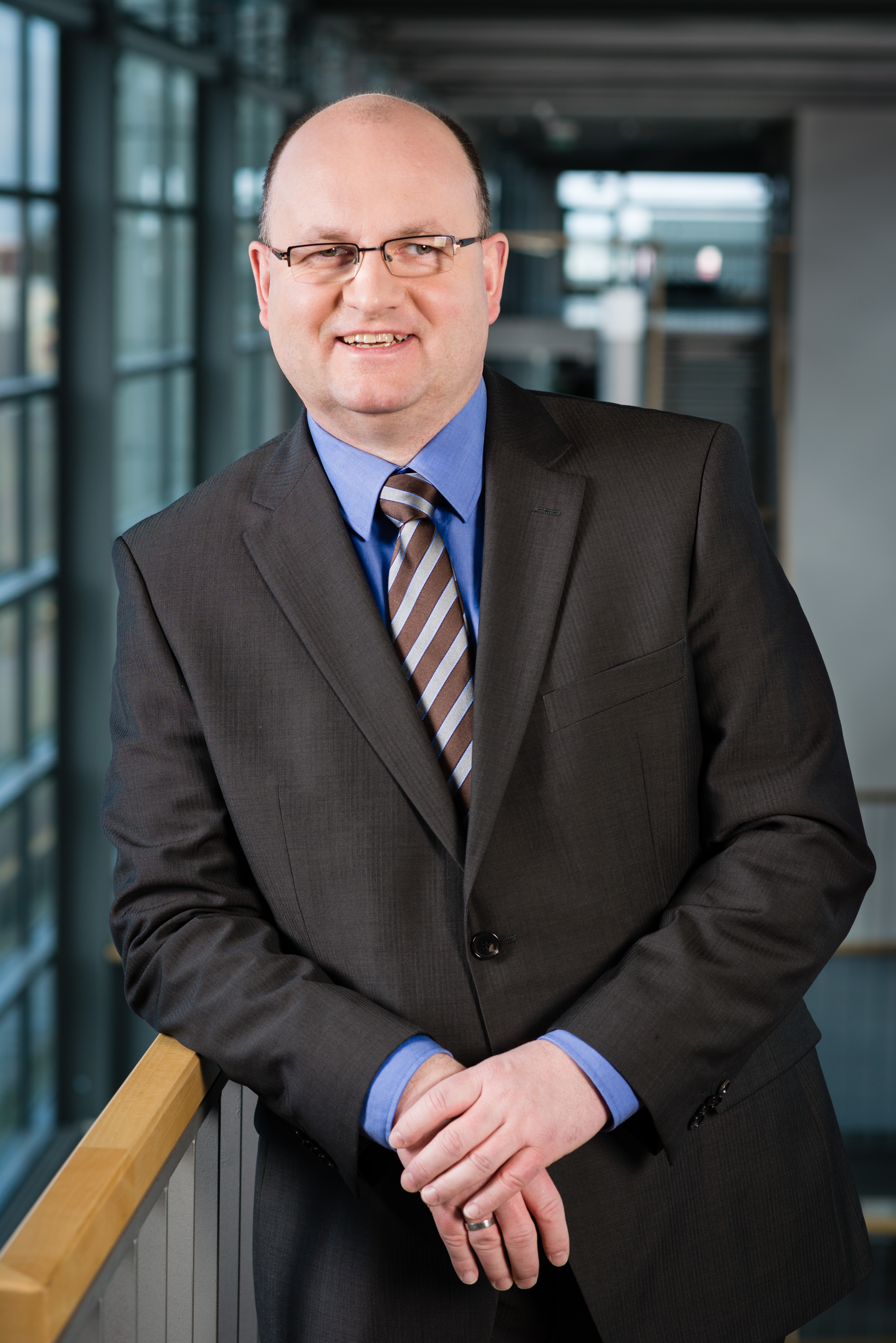

Peter Benner (born May 25, 1967) is a German mathematician specialized in dynamical systems and numerical analysis. He was managing director at the Max Planck Institute for Dynamics of Complex Technical Systems in Magdeburg, Germany.

== Education and career ==
Benner was born in Kirchen (Sieg). After graduating from high school in 1986 at the Freiherr vom Stein Gymnasium in Betzdorf, Benner studied mathematics with a minor in economics/operations research at the RWTH Aachen University from 1987. In 1993 he received the Springorum commemorative coin from RWTH Aachen for his diploma thesis. He received his doctorate in 1997 in the field of mathematics from the Chemnitz University of Technology under the supervision of Volker Mehrmann. From 1997 to 2001 he worked as a research assistant at the Center for Technomathematics at the University of Bremen. He completed his habilitation there in 2001.

From 2001 to 2003, Benner taught as a senior assistant at the Institute for Mathematics at Technische Universität Berlin. In the meantime he worked as a visiting professor at the Hamburg University of Technology. In 2003 he accepted a professorship for mathematics in industry and technology at Chemnitz University of Technology. Benner was a visiting scientist and professor at the University of Kansas, the Università di Modena e Reggio Emilia, the Lawrence Berkeley National Laboratory, the Courant Institute of Mathematical Sciences of New York University, Virginia Tech, the Université du Littoral Côte d'Opale in Calais and Shanghai University employed. In 2018 he was a J. Tinsley Oden Faculty Fellow at the University of Texas at Austin.

In 2010, Benner was appointed director and scientific member at the Max Planck Institute for Dynamics of Complex Technical Systems. He began research there with his specialist group Computational Methods in Systems and Control Theory at the Max Planck Institute on May 1, 2010. In the same year he was a visiting professor at the Université du Littoral Côte d'Opale in Calais, France. At the beginning of 2011 he was appointed honorary professor of mathematics at the Otto von Guericke University Magdeburg. In 2015, he was Distinguished Professor at Shanghai University. Since 2017 he has been a Fellow of the Society for Industrial and Applied Mathematics (SIAM) since 2017.

Benner is co-editor of various publications and mathematical journals, including the SIAM Journal on Matrix Analysis and Applications and co-author of various software packages. He is involved in mathematical societies, including SIAM and the Society for Applied Mathematics and Mechanics (GAMM). He has also been a member of the Niconet e.V. association since 2006. V., who develops and maintains the software library “Subroutine Library in Systems and Control” (SLICOT).

== Bibliography ==
- Benner, Peter; Sorensen, Danny C.; Mehrmann, Volker, eds. (2005). Dimension Reduction of Large-Scale Systems: Proceedings of a Workshop held in Oberwolfach, Germany, October 19–25, 2003. Lecture Notes in Computational Science and Engineering. Vol. 45. Berlin, Heidelberg: Springer Berlin Heidelberg. doi:10.1007/3-540-27909-1. ISBN 978-3-540-24545-2.
- Benner, Peter; Hinze, Michael; ter Maten, E. Jan W., eds. (2011). Model Reduction for Circuit Simulation. Lecture Notes in Electrical Engineering. Vol. 74. Dordrecht: Springer Netherlands. doi:10.1007/978-94-007-0089-5. ISBN 978-94-007-0088-8.
- Benner, Peter; Findeisen, Rolf; Flockerzi, Dietrich; Reichl, Udo; Sundmacher, Kai, eds. (2014). Large-Scale Networks in Engineering and Life Sciences. Modeling and Simulation in Science, Engineering and Technology. Cham: Springer International Publishing. doi:10.1007/978-3-319-08437-4. ISBN 978-3-319-08436-7.
- Benner, Peter; Bollhöfer, Matthias; Kressner, Daniel; Mehl, Christian; Stykel, Tatjana, eds. (2015). Numerical Algebra, Matrix Theory, Differential-Algebraic Equations and Control Theory: Festschrift in Honor of Volker Mehrmann. Cham: Springer International Publishing. doi:10.1007/978-3-319-15260-8. ISBN 978-3-319-15259-2.
- Benner, Peter; Ohlberger, Mario; Patera, Anthony; Rozza, Gianluigi; Urban, Karsten, eds. (2017). Model Reduction of Parametrized Systems. MS&A. Vol. 17. Cham: Springer International Publishing. doi:10.1007/978-3-319-58786-8. ISBN 978-3-319-58785-1.
- Benner, Peter, ed. (2017). System Reduction for Nanoscale IC Design. Mathematics in Industry. Vol. 20. Cham: Springer International Publishing. doi:10.1007/978-3-319-07236-4. ISBN 978-3-319-07235-7.
- Benner, Peter; Breiten, Tobias; Faßbender, Heike; Hinze, Michael; Stykel, Tatjana; Zimmermann, Ralf, eds. (2021). Model Reduction of Complex Dynamical Systems. International Series of Numerical Mathematics. Vol. 171. Cham: Springer International Publishing. doi:10.1007/978-3-030-72983-7. ISBN 978-3-030-72982-0.
