= Daniel Kressner =

German numerical analyst

- Born: Daniel Kressner; 7 April 1978 (age 48); Karl-Marx-Stadt, German Democratic Republic
- Citizenship: Germany
- Education: TU Berlin
- Scientific career
- Fields: Mathematics; Numerical analysis; Numerical linear algebra; Mathematical software
- Workplaces: EPF Lausanne
- Thesis: Numerical Methods and Software for General and Structured Eigenvalue Problems (2004)
- Doctoral advisor: Volker Mehrmann
- Website: people.epfl.ch/daniel.kressner/

Daniel Kressner (born 7 April 1978) is a German numerical analyst. He has a Chair of Numerical Algorithms and High Performance Computing in the Institute of Mathematics at EPF Lausanne.

== Education and career ==
Kressner was born in Karl-Marx-Stadt. He studied Mathematics at TU Chemnitz from 1997 to 2001 and gained his PhD from TU Berlin in 2004. His PhD thesis ("Numerical Methods and Software for General and Structured Eigenvalue Problems") was supervised by Volker Mehrmann. He was appointed assistant professor in Applied Mathematics at ETH Zurich in 2007. In 2011, he was appointed tenure-track assistant professor in Mathematics at EPF Lausanne, where he became associate professor in 2012 and full professor in 2017. Kressner held visiting positions as an Emmy Noether Fellow of the DFG at the University of Zagreb in 2005 and Umeå University in 2006. In 2018, he was the John von Neumann visiting professor at the Technical University of Munich.

Kressner has been the Editor-in-Chief of ACM Transactions on Mathematical Software in 2017, and he is on the editorial boards of journals including the SIAM Journal on Matrix Analysis and its Applications, SIAM Journal on Numerical Analysis, and Linear Algebra and Its Applications.

== Research ==
Kressner is best known for his work on numerical methods, in particular for linear eigenvalue problems, nonlinear eigenvalue problems, and low-rank approximation techniques for matrix problems.

== Recognition ==
He has been awarded a second Leslie Fox Prize for Numerical Analysis from the Institute of Mathematics and its Applications in 2007. In 2011 he received the John Todd Award from the Mathematical Research Institute of Oberwolfach.

He was elected as a Fellow of the Society for Industrial and Applied Mathematics, in the 2022 Class of SIAM Fellows, "for contributions in numerical linear and multilinear algebra and scientific computing".

== Selected publications ==
- Grasedyck, Lars; Kressner, Daniel; Tobler, Christine (2013). "A literature survey of low-rank tensor approximation techniques". GAMM-Mitteilungen. 36 (1). Wiley: 53–78. arXiv:1302.7121. doi:10.1002/gamm.201310004. ISSN 0936-7195. S2CID 7038912.
- Kressner, Daniel; Steinlechner, Michael; Vandereycken, Bart (7 November 2013). "Low-rank tensor completion by Riemannian optimization". BIT Numerical Mathematics. 54 (2). Springer Science and Business Media LLC: 447–468. doi:10.1007/s10543-013-0455-z. ISSN 0006-3835. S2CID 15624266.
- Kressner, Daniel; Tobler, Christine (2010). "Krylov Subspace Methods for Linear Systems with Tensor Product Structure". SIAM Journal on Matrix Analysis and Applications. 31 (4). Society for Industrial & Applied Mathematics (SIAM): 1688–1714. doi:10.1137/090756843. ISSN 0895-4798.
- Kressner, Daniel (15 September 2009). "A block Newton method for nonlinear eigenvalue problems". Numerische Mathematik. 114 (2). Springer Science and Business Media LLC: 355–372. doi:10.1007/s00211-009-0259-x. hdl:20.500.11850/19530. ISSN 0029-599X. S2CID 9766994.
- Thanou, Dorina; Dong, Xiaowen; Kressner, Daniel; Frossard, Pascal (2017). "Learning Heat Diffusion Graphs". IEEE Transactions on Signal and Information Processing over Networks. 3 (3). Institute of Electrical and Electronics Engineers (IEEE): 484–499. arXiv:1611.01456. doi:10.1109/tsipn.2017.2731164. ISSN 2373-776X. S2CID 15493463.
