= International Workshop on Operator Theory and its Applications =

Annual mathematics conference series

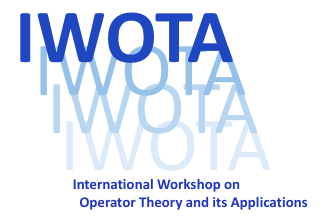
- Formation: 1981; 45 years ago
- Chair of Vice Presidents: J. William Helton

International Workshop on Operator Theory and its Applications (IWOTA) was started in 1981 to bring together mathematicians and engineers working in operator theoretic side of functional analysis and its applications to related fields. These include:

- Differential equations and Integral equations
- Complex analysis and Harmonic analysis
- Linear system and Control theory
- Mathematical physics
- Signal processing
- Numerical analysis

The other major branch of operator theory, Operator algebras (C* and von Neumann Algebras), is not heavily represented at IWOTA and has its own conferences.

IWOTA gathers leading experts from all over the world for an intense exchange of new results, information and opinions, and for tracing the future developments in the field. The IWOTA meetings provide opportunities for participants (including young researchers) to present their own work in invited and contributed talks, to interact with other researchers from around the globe, and to broaden their knowledge of the field. In addition, IWOTA emphasizes cross-disciplinary interaction among mathematicians, electrical engineers and mathematical physicists. In the even years, the IWOTA workshop is a satellite meeting to the biennial International Symposium on the Mathematical Theory of Networks and Systems (MTNS). From the humble beginnings in the early 80's, the IWOTA workshops grew to become one of the largest continuing conferences attended by the community of researchers in operator theory.

== History of IWOTA ==
=== First IWOTA Meeting ===
The International Workshop on Operator Theory and its Applications was started on August 1, 1981, adjacent to the International Symposium on Mathematical Theory of Networks and Systems (MTNS) with goal of exposing operator theorists, even pure theorists, to recent developments in engineering (especially H-infinity methods in control theory) which had a significant intersection with operator theory. Israel Gohberg was the visionary and driving force of IWOTA and president of the IWOTA Steering Committee. From the beginning, J. W. Helton and M. A. Kaashoek served as vice presidents of the steering committee.

=== West Meets East ===
Besides the excitement of mathematical discovery over the decades at IWOTA, there was great excitement when the curtain between Soviet bloc and Western operator theorists fell. Until 1990, these two collections of extremely strong mathematicians seldom met due to the tight restrictions on travel from and in the communist countries. When the curtain dropped, the western mathematicians knew the classic Soviet papers but had a spotty knowledge of much of what else their counterparts were doing. Gohberg was one of the operator theorists who knew both sides and he guided IWOTA, a western institution, in bringing (and funding) many prominent FSU bloc operator theorists to speak at the meetings. As the IWOTA programs demonstrate, this significantly accelerated the cultures' mutual assimilation.

=== Previous IWOTA Meetings ===
#	Year	Location	Chief Organizer(s)	Proceedings in OTAA-series	Participation
1	1981	(United States) Santa Monica, CA, USA	J. W. Helton		$\pm$40
2	1983	Rehovot, Israel	H. Dym (Note: Harry Dym died on 18 July 2024.), I. Gohberg (Note: Israel Gohberg died on 12 October 2009.)	OTAA 12	$\pm$25
3	1985	Amsterdam, Netherlands	M. A. Kaashoek (Note: Rien Kaashoek died on 21 November 2024.)	OTAA 19	$\pm$60
4	1987	(United States) Mesa, AZ, USA	J. W. Helton, L. Rodman (Note: Leiba Rodman died on 2 March 2015.)	OTAA 35	$\pm$50
5	1989	Rotterdam, Netherlands	H. Bart	OTAA 50	$\pm$55
6	1991	Sapporo, Japan	T. Ando	OTAA 59	$\pm$50
7	1993	Vienna, Austria	H. Langer (Note: Heinz Langer died on 25 January 2024.)	OTAA 80	$\pm$60
8	1995	Regensburg, Germany	R. Mennicken (Note: Reinhard Mennicken died on 13 June 2019.)	OTAA 102 and 103	115
9	1996	(United States) Bloomington, IN, USA	H. Bercovici, C. Foiaş, (Note: Ciprian Foias died on 22 March 2020.) J. Stampfli (Note: Joseph Stampfli died on 28 December 2015.)	OTAA 115	55
10	1998	Groningen, Netherlands	A. Dijksma	OTAA 124	97
11	2000	Bordeaux, France	N. K. Nikolski	OTAA 129	202
12	2000	Faro, Portugal	A. F. dos Santos	OTAA 142	131
13	2002	(United States) Blacksburg, VA, USA	J. A. Ball, M. Klaus (Note: Martin Klaus died on 1 December 2024.)	OTAA 149	$\pm$100
14	2003	Cagliari, Italy	C. V. M. van der Mee, S. Seatzu (Note: Sebastiano Seatzu died on 13 February 2018.)	OTAA 160	107
15	2004	(United Kingdom) Newcastle, UK	M. A. Dritschel, N. Young	OTAA 171	145
16	2005	(United States) Storrs, CT, USA	V. Olshevsky	OTAA 179	53
17	2006	(South Korea) Seoul, Korea	I. B. Jung, W. Y. Lee, R. Curto	OTAA 187	160
18	2007	Potchefstroom, South Africa	J. J. Grobler, G. J. Groenewald	OTAA 195	52
19	2008	(United States) Williamsburg, Virginia, U.S.A	V. Bolotnikov, L. Rodman, I. Spitkovsky	OTAA 202 and 203	236
20	2009	Guanajuato, Mexico	N. Vasilevski (Note: Nikolai Vasilevski died on 26 February 2024.)	OTAA 220	109
21	2010	Berlin, Germany	J. Behrndt, K.-H. Förster, (Note: Karl-Heinz Förster died on 29 January 2017.) C. Trunk	OTAA 221	355
22	2011	Seville, Spain	A. Montes-Rodriguez	OTAA 236	245
23	2012	Sydney, Australia	T. ter Elst, P. Portal, D. Potapov	OTAA 240	110
24	2013	Bangalore, India	T. Bhattacharyya	OTAA 247	172
25	2014	Amsterdam, Netherlands	A. C. M. Ran	OTAA 255	304
26	2015	(Georgia (country)) Tbilisi, Georgia	R. Duduchava	OTAA 262	161
27	2016	(United States) St. Louis, USA	G. Knese		162
28	2017	Chemnitz, Germany	A. Böttcher	OTAA 268	157
29	2018	Shanghai, China	H. Lin, G. Yu	OTAA 278	352
30	2019	Lisbon, Portugal	A. Bastos	OTAA 282	471
31	2021	(United States) Orange, CA, USA	D. Alpay, D. Struppa	OTAA 290	191
32	2021	Lancaster, United Kingdom	G. Blower	OTAA 292	299
33	2022	Kraków, Poland	M. Ptak, M. Wojtylak	OTAA 295	375
34	2023	Helsinki, Finland	J. Virtanen	OTAA 307	405
35	2024	Canterbury, United Kingdom	I. Wood		384
36	2025	Enschede, Netherlands	F. Schwenninger, H. Zwart, E. Lorist		370
37	2026	Québec City, Canada	J. Mashreghi, F. Morneau-Guérin, L. Bouthat		299

=== IWOTA Proceedings ===
Proceedings of the IWOTA workshops appear in the Springer / Birkhäuser Verlag book series Operator Theory: Advances and Applications (OTAA) (founder: Israel Gohberg). While engineering conference proceedings often are handed to participants as they arrive and contain short papers on each conference talk, the IWOTA proceedings follow mathematics conference tradition and contain a modest number of papers and are published several years after the conference.

=== Funding Sources ===
IWOTA has received support from many sources, including the National Science Foundation , the London Mathematical Society, the Engineering and Physical Sciences Research Council, Deutsche Forschungsgemeinschaft, Secretaría de Estado de Investigación, Desarrollo e Innovación (Spain), Australian Mathematical Sciences Institute, National Board for Higher Mathematics, International Centre for Theoretical Physics, Indian Statistical Institute, Korea Research Foundation, United States-India Science & Technology Endowment Fund, Nederlandse Organisatie voor Wetenschappelijk Onderzoek, the Commission for Developing Countries of the International Mathematical Union, Stichting Advancement of Mathematics (Netherlands), the National Research Foundation of South Africa, and Birkhäuser Publishing Ltd.

== The IWOTA Steering Committee ==
IWOTA is directed by a steering committee which chooses the site for the next meeting, elects the chief local organizer(s) and insures the appearance of the enduring themes of IWOTA. The sub-themes of an IWOTA workshop and the lecturers are chosen by the local organizing committee after hearing the steering committee's board. The board consists of its vice presidents: Joseph A. Ball, J. William Helton (Chair, 2018-present), Sanne ter Horst, Igor Klep, Christiane Tretter, Irene Sabadini, Victor Vinnikov and Hugo J. Woerdeman. In addition, past chief organizers who remain active in IWOTA are members of the steering committee. The board governs IWOTA with consultation and the consent of the full steering committee. Honorary members of the steering committee, elected in 2016, are: Israel Gohberg (deceased in 2009), Leiba Rodman (deceased in 2015), Tsuyoshi Ando, Harry Dym (deceased in 2024), Ciprian Foias (deceased in 2020), Heinz Langer (deceased in 2024), Nikolai Nikolski. Honorary member of the steering committee, elected in 2024, is: Rien Kaashoek (deceased in 2024; Chair of Vice Presidents 2009-2018).

== Future IWOTA Meetings ==
- IWOTA 2027 will be held at KTH Royal Institute of Technology in Stockholm, Sweden. Main organizers are Jani Virtanen, Håkan Hedenmalm and Ozan Öktem. Dates are July 5-9, 2027.
- IWOTA 2028 will be held at Hamburg University of Technology (TUHH) in Hamburg, Germany. Main organizers are Christian Seifert and Marko Lindner. Dates are July 17-21, 2028.

== Israel Gohberg ILAS-IWOTA Lecture ==
The Israel Gohberg ILAS-IWOTA Lecture was introduced in August 2016 and honors the legacy of Israel Gohberg, whose research crossed borders between operator theory, linear algebra, and related fields. This lecture is in collaboration with the International Linear Algebra Society (ILAS). This series of lectures will be delivered at IWOTA and ILAS Conferences, in different years, in the approximate ratio two-thirds at IWOTA and one-third at ILAS. The first three lectures will take place at IWOTA Lancaster UK 2021, ILAS 2022, and IWOTA 2024. Donations for the Israel Gohberg ILAS-IWOTA Lecture Fund are most welcome and can be submitted via the ILAS donation form. Donations are tax deductible in the United States.
