= Sohini Kar-Narayan =

- Education: Indian Institute of Science; Presidency College, Kolkata
- Awards: Peter Day Award (2023)
- Scientific career
- Workplaces: Max Planck Institute for Dynamics of Complex Technical Systems; University of Cambridge
- Website: https://www.kar-narayan.msm.cam.ac.uk/

Sohini Kar-Narayan is a British–Indian materials scientist, Director at the Max Planck Institute for Dynamics of Complex Technical Systems in Germany, Professor of Device Materials in the Department of Materials Science at the University of Cambridge in the UK, and editor-in-chief of the journal APL Electronic Devices, published by the American Institute of Physics. Her research considers polymer based materials for energy harvesting. She was awarded the 2023 Royal Society of Chemistry Peter Day Prize and was recognized as one of the Top 50 Women in Engineering of 2021 by the Women’s Engineering Society. She was elected Fellow of the Royal Academy of Engineering in 2024.

== Early life and education ==
Kar-Narayan was born and raised in Nigeria before moving to India to earn her undergraduate degree at the Presidency University, Kolkata. She was a graduate student at the Indian Institute of Science. After earning her doctorate in 2009, she moved to the University of Cambridge, where she was awarded a Dorothy Hodgkin Fellowship.

== Research and career ==
Kar-Narayan was made a lecturer at the University of Cambridge in 2015, and then a professor in 2018. Her research considers the development of nanomaterials for sensing, biomedical applications and energy. She was awarded a European Research Council Starting Grant to develop piezoelectric nanogenerators.

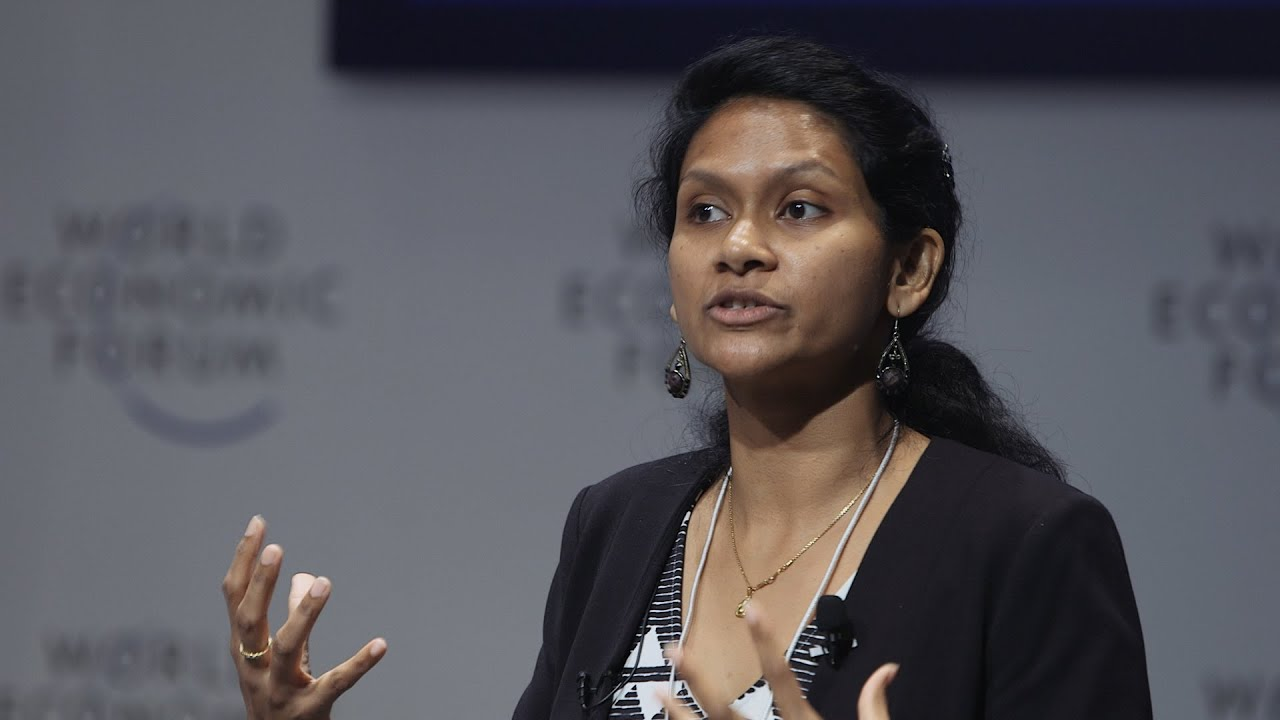
Sohini Kar-Narayan (World Economic Forum, 2015)

In 2022, Kar-Narayan was awarded the Armourers and Brasiers' Venture Prize for ArtioSense, a smart sensor that can help orthopaedic surgeons provide personalised care following surgical implants. Kar-Narayan developed microfluidic force sensors that facilitate soft tissue balance and help to precisely place implants. She created the sensor in partnership with surgeons, recognising that they needed to complement the surgical process without changing the workflow. She was named “Innovator of the Year” at the 2024 Electronics Weekly Women Leaders in Electronics Awards and has been awarded the 2025 Royal Microscopical Society AFM and SPM Award.

== Awards and honours ==
- 2015 World Economic Forum Young Scientist Award
- 2021 Top 50 Influential Women in Engineering
- 2022 Armourers and Brasiers' Venture Prize
- 2022 Elected Fellow of the Institute of Materials, Minerals and Mining
- 2023 Royal Society of Chemistry Peter Day Prize
- 2023 European Research Council Consolidator Grant
- 2024 AFM and SPM Award, Royal Microscopical Society
- 2024 Innovator of the Year, Women Leaders in Electronics awards (Electronics Weekly)
- 2024 Elected a fellow of the Royal Academy of Engineering
- 2025 Royal Microscopical Society AFM and SPM Award

== Selected publications ==
- Xavier Moya; Sohini Kar-Narayan; N D Mathur (1 May 2014). "Caloric materials near ferroic phase transitions". Nature Materials. 13 (5): 439–450. doi:10.1038/NMAT3951. ISSN 1476-1122. PMID 24751772.
- Xavier Moya; Enric Stern-Taulats; Sam Crossley; David González-Alonso; Sohini Kar-Narayan; Antoni Planes; Lluís Mañosa; Neil D Mathur (11 January 2013). "Giant electrocaloric strength in single-crystal BaTiO3". Advanced Materials. 25 (9): 1360–1365. doi:10.1002/ADMA.201203823. ISSN 0935-9648. PMID 23307287.
- Tiesheng Wang; Meisam Farajollahi; Yeon Sik Choi; et al. (1 August 2016). "Electroactive polymers for sensing". Interface Focus. 6 (4) 20160026. doi:10.1098/RSFS.2016.0026. ISSN 2042-8898. PMC 4918837. PMID 27499846.
