= Marina Gavrilova =

Russian-Canadian computer scientist

Marina Lvovna Gavrilova (born 1971) is a Russian-Canadian computer scientist whose research interests include machine learning, data fusion, and biometrics, including the use of behavioral characteristics to unmask anonymous social network contributors. She has also published well-cited research on the use of Voronoi diagrams in path planning. She is a professor of computer science at the University of Calgary in Canada, where she holds a UCalgary Research Excellence Chair. She is also the editor-in-chief of Transactions on Computational Sciences.

== Education and career ==
Gavrilova earned a master's degree in computer science in 1993 from Lomonosov State University in Moscow. She completed her Ph.D. at the University of Calgary in 1999. Her doctoral dissertation, Proximity and Applications in General Metrics, was supervised by Jon Rokne.

She is editor-in-chief of Transactions on Computational Science, an academic journal whose volumes are published as a series of edited volumes in the Lecture Notes in Computer Science book series.

== Recognition ==
In 2021 the University of Calgary named Gavrilova as a recipient of the Order of the University of Calgary. In 2022 the university named her as a Killam Annual Professor, and in 2023 she was one of 22 professors to be awarded an inaugural UCalgary Research Excellence Chair.
