= Udo Reichl =

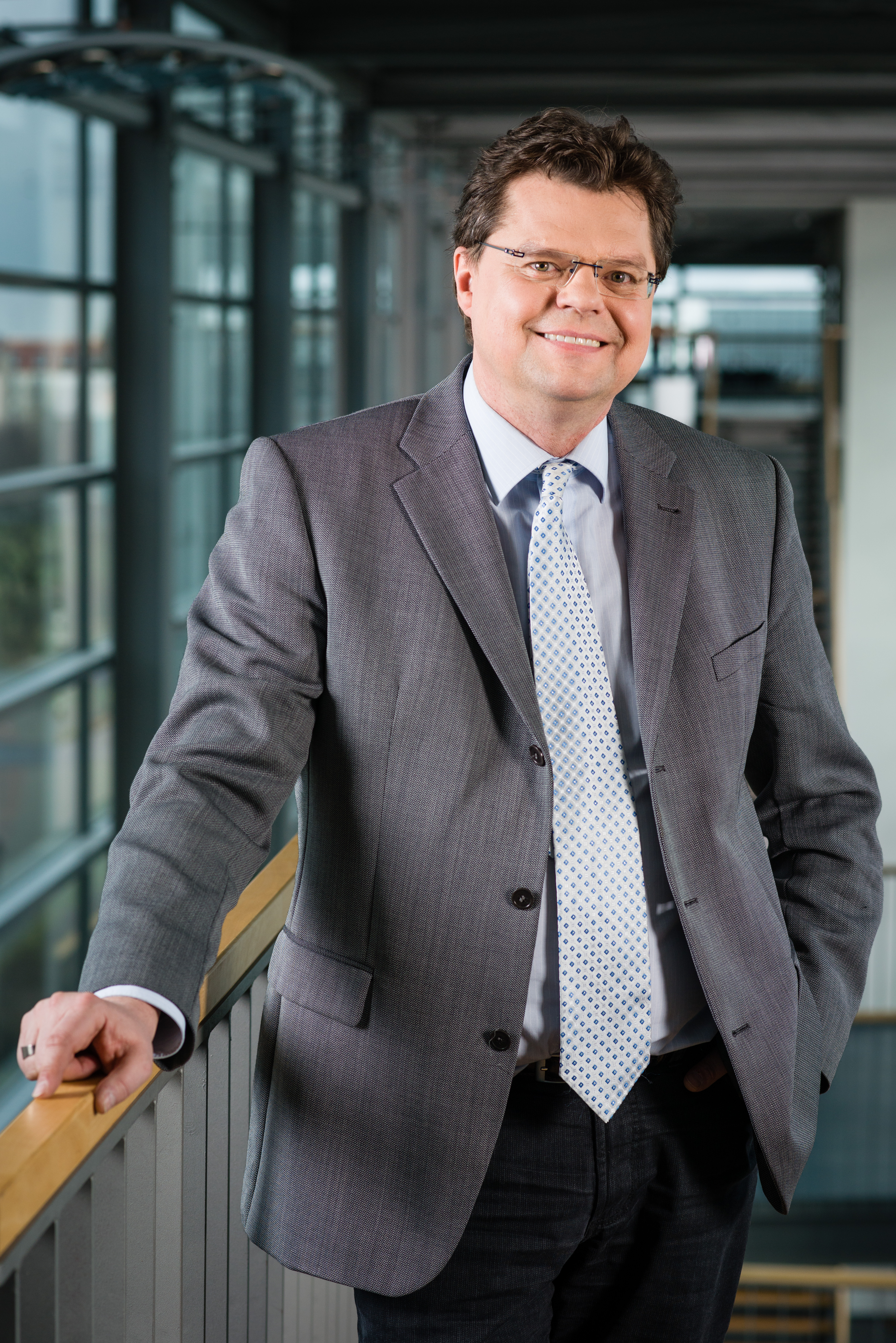
Udo Reichl, 2013, Image rights: Max Planck Institute for Dynamics of Complex Technical Systems

Udo Reichl (born 22 October 1959, in Kaufbeuren) a German bioengineer, is leader of the Research Group Bioprocess Engineering at the Max Planck Institute for Dynamics of Complex Technical Systems in Magdeburg and Chair of Bioprocess Engineering at the Otto-von-Guericke University Magdeburg.

== Education and professional career ==
Reichl studied biology at Saarland University, Germany, and Chemical Engineering at Stuttgart University, where he gained his PhD at the Institute for Systems Dynamic and Control. After holding several postdoc positions he became head of virus productions at Pitman-Moore GmbH in Burgwedel near Hanover, Germany. Since 1999 he has held the Chair of Bioprocess Engineering at the Otto-von-Guericke University Magdeburg, and he was appointed Director at the MPI for the Dynamics of Complex Technical Systems in 2000.

== Major research interests ==
His major research interests are the optimization and scale-up of viral-based production processes, chromatographic methods, chromatographic methods for purification of viral antigen, mathematical modeling, monitoring and control of bioprocesses and cellular systems, including quantitative analysis of cellular metabolic and regulation networks and proteomics, particularly the characterization of protein structures involved in glycosylation.

== Awards, honors & memberships (selection) ==
| Year | Position |
|---|---|
| since 2013 | Member to the Saxonian Academy of Sciences and Humanities, Leipzig (Germany) |
| since 2009 | Member of Management Board of the DECHEMA-Society for Chemical Engineering and Biotechnology, Frankfurt/Main (Germany) |
| since 2007 | Coordinator of the CNRS/MPG European Network in Systems Biology |
| since 2004 | Member of the Core Commission of the MPG-CAS Institute "Computational Biology", Shanghai (China) |
| 2003 - 2010 | Member of the Perspective Commission of the CPT (Chemistry, Physics & Technology) Section, MPG (Germany) |
| since 2001 | Member of the Advisory Board: Engineering in Life Science |

== Publications (selection) ==
- List of Publications
