= James H. Wilkinson Prize in Numerical Analysis and Scientific Computing =

The James H. Wilkinson Prize in Numerical Analysis and Scientific Computing is awarded every four years by the Society for Industrial and Applied Mathematics (SIAM). The award, named in honor of James H. Wilkinson, is made for research in, or other contributions to, numerical analysis and scientific computing during the 6 years preceding the year of the award. The prizewinner receives the prize, with $2000 (US), at the autumn conference of SIAM and gives a lecture there. It is intended to stimulate younger scientists in the early years of their careers.

== Prize winners ==
- 1982 Björn Engquist
- 1985 Charles S. Peskin
- 1989 Paul Van Dooren
- 1993 James Demmel
- 1997 Andrew M. Stuart
- 2001 Thomas Y. Hou
- 2005 Emmanuel Candès
- 2009 Assyr Abdulle
- 2013 Lexing Ying
- 2017 Lek-Heng Lim
- 2021 Stefan Güttel
- 2025 Erin Carson

== See also ==
- List of computer science awards
- List of mathematics awards
