= Peter Lancaster =

Canadian mathematician

- Born: 14 November 1929 (age 96); Appleby, England
- Education: National University of Singapore
- Spouse: Edna Hutchinson (m. 1951, died)
- Awards: Hans Schneider Prize (2004); Humboldt Prize (2000)
- Scientific career
- Workplaces: University of Calgary
- Thesis: On the Theory of Lambda-Matrices with Applications to the Analysis of Vibrating Systems (1964)
- Doctoral advisor: Daniel Pedoe
- Doctoral students: Jon Rokne

Peter Lancaster (born 14 November 1929) is a British–Canadian mathematician. He is professor emeritus at the University of Calgary, where he has worked since 1962. His research focuses on matrix analysis and related fields, motivated by problems from vibration theory, numerical analysis, systems theory, and signal processing.

== Biography ==
Lancaster was born in Appleby, England, and attended Sir John Deane's Grammar School and the Liverpool Collegiate School. After an unsuccessful year in the University of Liverpool School of Architecture, he joined the mathematics program in the same university, graduating with an honours degree in 1952. Lancaster thereupon worked as an aerodynamicist with the English Electric Company until 1957, completing a Master's degree at the same time under the supervision of Louis Rosenhead.

He took a teaching post at the University of Malaya, from which he was granted a PhD in 1964, and moved to Canada in November 1962 to work at the University of Calgary. Lancaster held visiting positions at the California Institute of Technology (1965–66), the University of Basel (1968–69), and the University of Dundee (1975–76) as well as shorter stays at the Universities of Münster, Tel Aviv, Konstanz, and Ben-Gurion.

Lancaster served as Department Chairman from 1973 to 1977, and President of the Canadian Mathematical Society from 1979 to 1981. He was elected a Fellow of the Royal Society of Canada in 1984, and was the recipient of the Jeffery–Williams Prize in 1991. Lancaster received a Humboldt Research Award in 2000. In 2018 the Canadian Mathematical Society listed him in their inaugural class of fellows.

== See also ==
- Peter Lancaster at the Mathematics Genealogy Project
