= Bryan Shader =

American mathematician (born 1961)

Bryan Lynn Shader (born 17 December 1961) is a professor of mathematics at the University of Wyoming. He received his Ph.D. from University of Wisconsin-Madison in 1990, his advisor was Professor Richard Brualdi. Shader is the Editor-in-chief of the Electronic Journal of Linear Algebra. He is also Associate Editor of other two journals, Linear Algebra and its Applications (since 2003) and Linear & Multilinear Algebra (since 2009). He is one of the most active mathematicians working on Combinatorial Matrix Theory. He is also noted for his monograph on matrices of sign-solvable linear systems. Besides organizing many workshops, he is a co-principal investigator of Math Teacher Leadership Program, a National Science Foundation project (2009–2014). Shader is special assistant to the vice-president of Research of University of Wyoming.

Shader received the 2005 Burton W. Jones Distinguished Teaching Award from the Rocky Mountain Section of the Mathematical Association of America.

== Personal life ==
Bryan Shader has a daughter named Sarah Shader who graduated from the Massachusetts Institute of Technology with a degree in computer science.

== Books ==
- (With Richard Brualdi) Matrices of sign-solvable linear systems. Cambridge Tracts in Mathematics, 116, 1995
- (With Richard Brualdi) Graph and Matrices, Chapter 3 in Topics in Algebraic Graph Theory, Encyclopedia of Mathematics and its Applications, 102, Cambridge University Press, 2005
- Bipartite Graph and Matrices, Chapter 30, Handbook of Linear Algebra, CRC Press, 2007
