= Electronic Transactions on Numerical Analysis =

- Discipline: Applied mathematics
- Language: English
- Edited by: Lothar Reichel, Ronny Ramlau

Publication details
- Publisher: Kent State University, Johann Radon Institute (RICAM)
- Open access: Free to authors and readers

Standard abbreviations
- ISO 4: Electron. Trans. Numer. Anal.

Indexing
- ISSN: 1068-9613

Links
- ETNA homepage; ETNA homepage

Electronic Transactions on Numerical Analysis is a peer-reviewed scientific open access journal publishing original research in applied mathematics with the focus on numerical analysis and scientific computing. It is published by the Kent State University and the Johann Radon Institute for Computational and Applied Mathematics (RICAM). Articles for this journal are published in electronic form on the journal's web site. The journal is one of the oldest scientific open access journals in mathematics.

The Electronic Transactions on Numerical Analysis were founded in 1992 by Richard S. Varga, Arden Ruttan, and Lothar Reichel (all Kent State University) as a fully open access journal (no fee for reader or authors). The first issue appeared in September 1993. The current editors-in-chief are Lothar Reichel and Ronny Ramlau.

== Editors-in-chief ==
- 1993–2008: Richard S. Varga
- 1993–1998: Arden Ruttan
- 2005–2013: Daniel Szyld
- since 1993: Lothar Reichel
- since 2010: Ronny Ramlau

== No-fee open access and copyright ==
Since its foundation, the journal follows an open access policy that allows free access to readers and charges no fee for authors ("diamond open access"). Authors transfer the copyright of published articles to the editors. This publication model is based on the one hand on support of the editing institutions and on donations. On the other hand, the editing process is carried out by volunteers from the scientific community.

== Abstracting and indexing ==
The journal is abstracted and indexed in the Science Citation Index Expanded Mathematical Reviews, and Zentralblatt MATH. According to the Journal Citation Reports, the journal has a 2015 impact factor of 0.671 (highest 1.261 in 2012)
