= Jon Rokne =

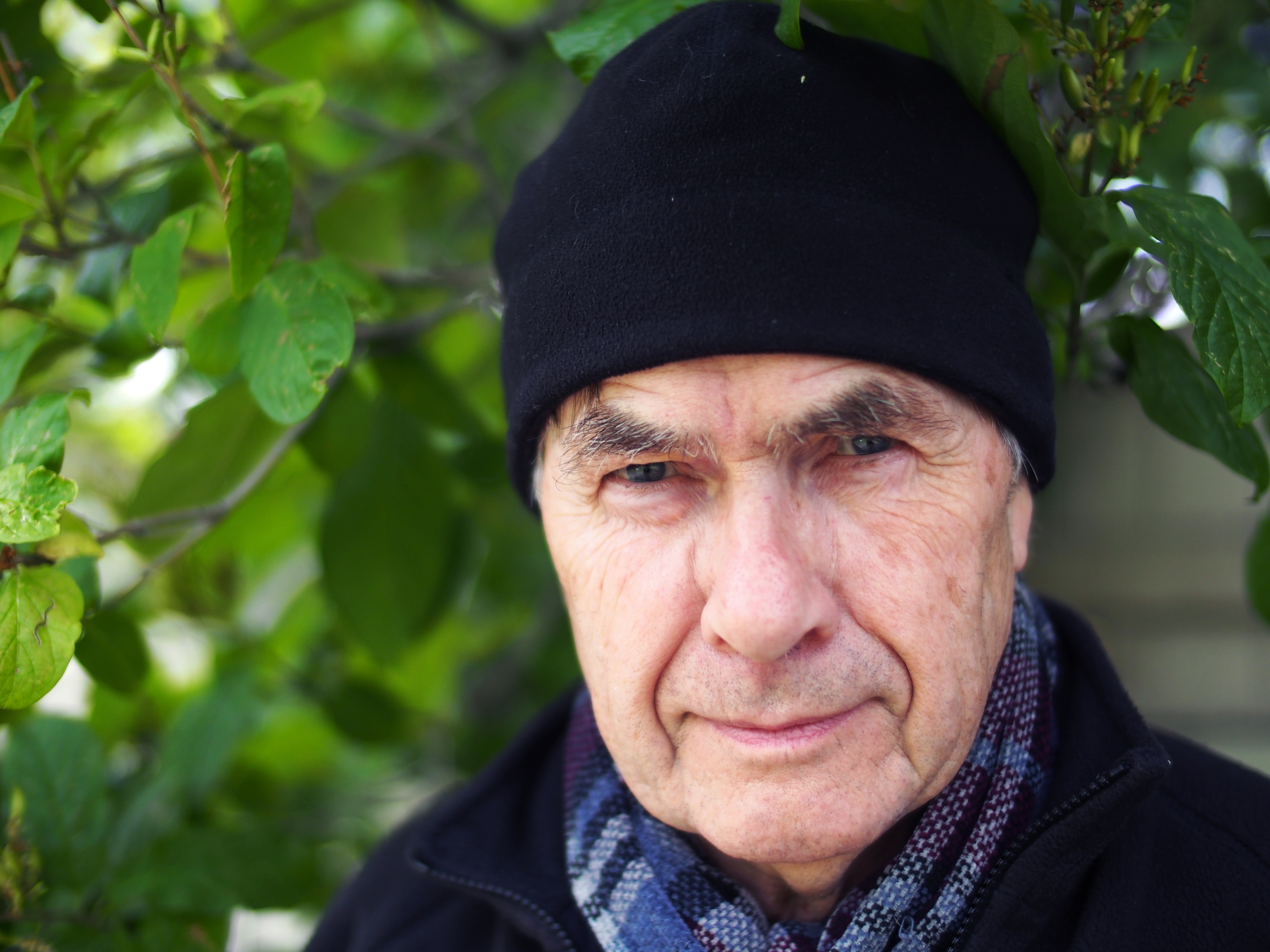
Jon Rokne, 2017, Calgary, Alberta

Jon George Rokne is a Norwegian-Canadian computer scientist, a distinguished professor of computer science at the University of Calgary.

Rokne earned his Ph.D. at the University of Calgary in 1970, with the dissertation Practical and Theoretical Studies in Numerical Error Analysis supervised by Peter Lancaster.

Rokne was the doctoral advisor of Marina Gavrilova and Mojtaba Eslami and many other distinguished scholar scientists. With Reda Alhajj, he is the editor of the Encyclopedia of Social Network Analysis and Mining (Springer, 2014).

Rokne was named Fellow of the Institute of Electrical and Electronics Engineers (IEEE) in 2013 "for contributions to computer graphics and geographic information systems".
