= Joseph A. Ball (mathematician) =

American mathematician

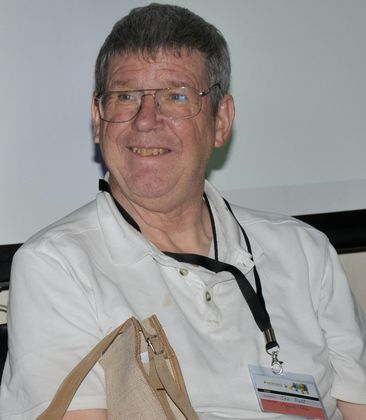
- Joe Ball at IWOTA 2013 in Bangalore
- Born: 4 June 1947 (age 79)
- Citizenship: United States
- Education: Georgetown University, University of Virginia
- Scientific career
- Fields: (Multidimensional)System Theory, (Multivariable)Operator Theory and Complex Analysis
- Workplaces: Virginia Polytechnic Institute and State University, Blacksburg
- Doctoral advisor: Marvin Rosenblum.
- Website: www.math.vt.edu/people/ball/

Joseph Anthony Ball (born 4 June 1947) is an American mathematician who is currently a professor emeritus at the Virginia Polytechnic Institute and State University, often referred to as Virginia Tech. He is a 2019 fellow of the American Mathematical Society for contributions to operator theory, analytic functions, and service to the profession.

He was awarded Bachelor of Science from Georgetown University in 1969. He obtained his Master of Science in 1970 and Doctor of Philosophy in 1973 both from the University of Virginia, Charlottesville. The title of his doctoral dissertation is "Unitary Perturbations of Contractions", supervised by Marvin Rosenblum. According to current Mathematics Genealogy Project database, Ball has 12 students and 18 descendants.
