= Max Planck Institute for Dynamics of Complex Technical Systems =

German research institute

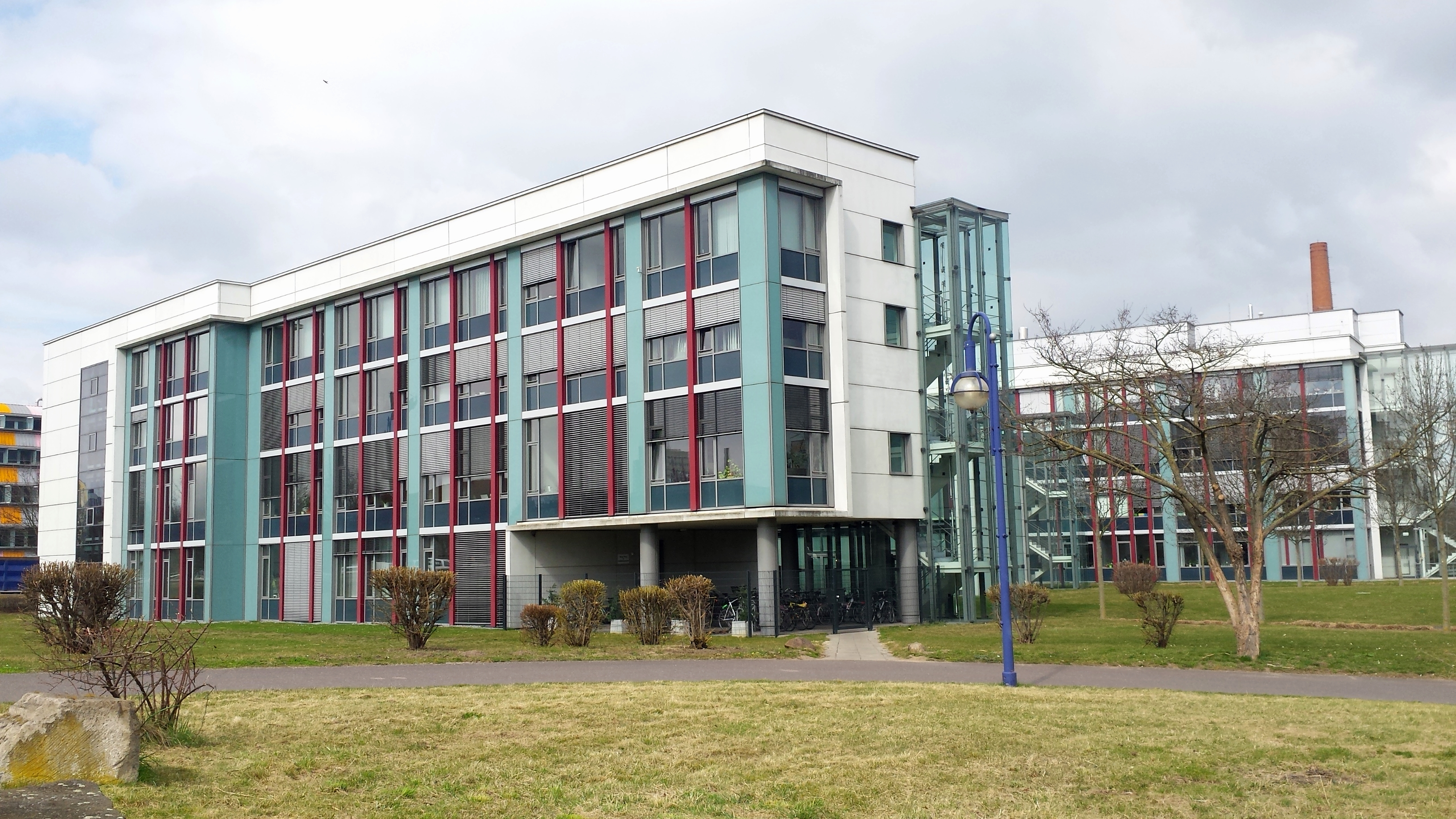
- Founded: 1996
- Type: Research Institute
- Location: Magdeburg, Germany
- Members: Max Planck Society
- Leader: Peter Benner
- Staff: approx. 230
- Website: mpi-magdeburg.mpg.de

The Max Planck Institute for Dynamics of Complex Technical Systems is a non-university research institute that is part of the Max Planck Society and is based in Magdeburg.

== History ==
The Max Planck Institute for Dynamics of Complex Technical Systems was founded in 1996 and is the first institute of the Max Planck Society to focus primarily on issues in the engineering sciences. It took up its work in Magdeburg in 1998.

== Organization ==
The institute currently consists of the following three departments, each headed by a director:

- Materials Systems Engineering (MSE) | Sohini Kar-Narayan
- Numerical Methods in Systems and Control Theory (CSC) | Peter Benner
- Process Engineering (PSE) | Kai Sundmacher

Research Groups:

- Analysis and Redesign of Biological Networks (ARB) | Steffen Klamt
- Phase Transition Engineering (PTE) | Leif-Thore Deck
- Electrochemical Energy Conversion (EEC) | Tanja Vidaković-Koch
- Molecular Simulations and Design (MSD) | Matthias Stein
- Mathematical Optimization and Machine Learning (OML) | Sebastian Sager
- Bioprocess Engineering (BPE) | Udo Reichl

== International Max Planck Research School (IMPRS) ==
Together with the Otto von Guericke University Magdeburg, the Institute runs the International Max Planck Research School for Systems and Process Engineering for a Sustainable Chemical Production. An IMPRS is an English-language doctoral program that provides a structured path to a Ph.D. The IMPRS spokesperson is Kai Sundmacher, who is also one of the directors of the MPI.

== Ernst Dieter Gilles Fellowship ==
Since 2020, the Max Planck Institute for the Dynamics of Complex Technical Systems has been awarding the “Ernst Dieter Gilles” Fellowship to young researchers who have completed their doctorates. It is named after the institute’s founding director, Ernst Dieter Gilles.
