= Lek-Heng Lim =

Lek-Heng Lim (Chinese: 林力行) is a Singaporean mathematician.

Lim earned a bachelor's degree at the National University of Singapore, studied for his master's at Cornell University and the University of Cambridge, and completed a doctorate at Stanford University. Lim started his teaching career at the University of California, Berkeley, where he served as Charles Morrey Assistant Professor. He later joined the University of Chicago faculty. While affiliated with Chicago, Lim won the James H. Wilkinson Prize in Numerical Analysis and Scientific Computing and Stephen Smale Prize in 2017, followed by the 2020 Hans Schneider Prize in Linear Algebra. In 2020, Lim was also elected a fellow of the American Mathematical Society.

Lim was awarded a Guggenheim Fellowship in April 2022.
