= Reichel =

Reichel is a German surname. It originates from the root ric meaning power. Notable people with the surname include:

- Achim Reichel (born 1944), German musician and music producer, member of The Rattles
- Bernard Reichel (1901–1992), Swiss classical composer
- Frantz Reichel (1871–1932), French athlete
- Gerardo Reichel-Dolmatoff (1912–1994), Austrian-born anthropologist
- Hans Reichel (1949–2011), German guitarist and inventor
- Idan Raichel (born 1977), Israeli singer-songwriter
- Kealiʻi Reichel (born 1962), Hawaiian musician and dancer
- Lukas Reichel (born 2002), German ice hockey player
- Manfred Reichel (1896–1984), Swiss micropaleontologist
- Peter Reichel (born 1951), German football player
- Robert Reichel (born 1971), Czech-born hockey player
- Robinson Reichel (born 1966), German actor
- Verena Reichel (born 1945), German translator

== See also ==
- Reich
- Reichl
- Reichel/Pugh, a yacht design company
- Pieris marginalis reicheli, a butterfly commonly known as Reichel's Margined White
