= Rien Kaashoek =

Dutch mathematician (1937–2024)

Marinus Adriaan "Rien" Kaashoek (November 10, 1937 – November 21, 2024) was a Dutch mathematician, and Emeritus Professor Analysis and Operator Theory at the Vrije Universiteit in Amsterdam.

== Biography ==
Born in Ridderkerk, Kaashoek studied mathematics at the Leiden University, where he received his PhD in 1964 under supervision of Adriaan Zaanen.

Kaashoek had started his academic career as assistant at the Leiden University from 1959 to 1962, and Junior Staff Member from 1962 to 1965. In 1966 he started as senior lecturer at the Vrije Universiteit, where in 1969 he was appointed professor. Among his doctoral students is Harm Bart (1973). Kaashoek has been at the University of Maryland, College Park in 1975, at the University of Calgary in 1987, at the Ben-Gurion University of the Negev in 1987 and at the Tel Aviv University on various occasions.

He was a member of the honorary editorial board of the Journal Integral Equations and Operator Theory, and has been appointed Knight in the Order of the Dutch Lion (Ridder in de Orde van de Nederlandse Leeuw) in 2002. In 2014 he received an honorary doctorate of North-West University in South-Africa (Potchefstroom campus). He was elected honorary member (erelid) of the Royal Dutch Mathematical Society (Koninklijk Wiskundig Genootschap) on 22 March 2016.

M. A. Kaashoek was one of the early supporters of the International Workshop on Operator Theory and its Applications (IWOTA), which was started in 1981. From the beginning, M. A. Kaashoek and J. W. Helton served as vice presidents of the IWOTA Steering Committee. In addition, M. A. Kaashoek organized the third IWOTA in 1985, the first time this series of conferences took place in Europe. Moreover, he maintained a website documenting the complete IWOTA series. Kaashoek died on November 21, 2024, at the age of 86.

== Work ==
Kaashoek's research interests are in the field of 'the "analysis and Operator Theory, and various connections between Operator Theory, Matrix Theory and Mathematical Systems Theory. In particular, Wiener–Hopf integral equations and Toeplitz operators, their nonstationary variants, and other structured operators, such as continuous operator analogs of Bézout and resultant matrices. State space methods for problems in analysis. Also metric constrained interpolation problems and completion problems for partially given operators, including relaxed commutant lifting problems."

== Publications ==
Kaashoek has authored and co-authored ten books A selection:

- 1974. Locally compact semi-algebras : with applications to spectral theory of positive operators. With Trevor West. Amsterdam; London : North-Holland Publishing Co.
- 1993. Classes of linear operators, Volume 1 and 2. With Israel Gohberg and Seymour Goldberg. Birkhäuser.
- 2003. Basic classes of linear operators. With Israel Gohberg and Seymour Goldberg. Springer.

Articles, a selection:

- Harm Bart, et al. "Factorizations of transfer functions." SIAM Journal on Control and Optimization 18.6 (1980): 675–696.
- Israel Gohberg and Marinus Adriaan Kaashoek. "Time varying linear systems with boundary conditions and integral operators. I. The transfer operator and its properties." Integral Equations and Operator Theory 7.3 (1984): 325–391.
