= Joe Ball (footballer) =

English footballer

Personal information
- Full name: Joseph Howard Ball
- Date of birth: 4 April 1931
- Place of birth: Walsall, England
- Date of death: 4 December 1974 (aged 43)
- Place of death: Farnham, England
- Position: Winger

Senior career*
Years	Team	Apps	(Gls)
19??–1951	Banbury Spencer		
1951–1954	Ipswich Town	32	(2)
1954–1956	Aldershot	31	(5)
- * Club domestic league appearances and goals

Joseph Howard Ball (4 April 1931 – 4 December 1974) was a professional footballer who played as a winger. He was born in Walsall. In a short career, he played for three clubs. They were Banbury Spencer who he left in 1951 for Ipswich Town. He stayed with them until 1954, when he moved to his final club, Aldershot.
