= Israel Gohberg =

Bessarabian-born Soviet and Israeli mathematician

- ישראל גוכברג
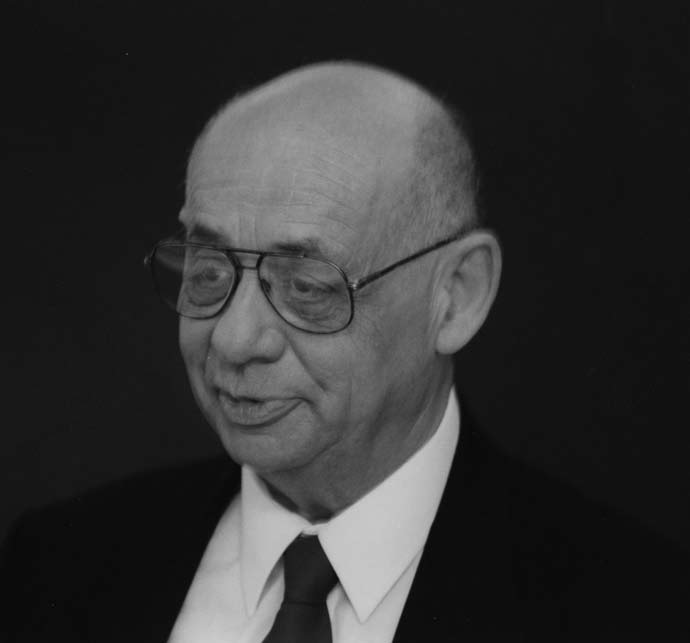
- Born: August 23, 1928; Tarutino, Bessarabia
- Died: October 12, 2009 (aged 81); Ra'anana, Israel
- Education: Kyrgyz Pedagogical Institute, Moldova State University, Leningrad State University, Moscow State University
- Known for: Operator theory, Functional analysis, Integral equations
- Awards: Humboldt Prize (1992), Honorary doctorates (multiple), M.G. Krein Prize (2008), SIAM Fellow (2009)
- Scientific career
- Fields: Mathematics
- Workplaces: Tel Aviv University, Weizmann Institute, Vrije Universiteit, University of Calgary, University of Maryland, College Park
- Doctoral advisor: Mark Krein

Israel Gohberg (Hebrew: ישראל גוכברג; Russian: Изра́иль Цу́дикович Го́хберг; 23 August 1928 – 12 October 2009) was a Bessarabian-born Soviet and Israeli mathematician, most known for his work in operator theory and functional analysis, in particular linear operators and integral equations.

== Biography ==
Gohberg was born in Tarutino to parents Tsudik and Haya Gohberg. His father owned a small typography shop and his mother was a midwife. The young Gohberg studied in a Hebrew school in Taurtyne and then a Romanian school in Orhei, where he was influenced by the tutelage of Modest Shumbarsky, a student of the renowned topologist Karol Borsuk.

He studied at the Kyrgyz Pedagogical Institute in Bishkek and at Moldova State University in Chișinău, completed his doctorate at Leningrad State University on a thesis advised by Mark Krein (1954), and attended Moscow State University for his habilitation degree.

Gohberg joined the faculty at the Teacher's college in Soroca and the Teachers college in Bălți before returning to Chișinău where he was elected into the Academy of Sciences and also being appointed head of functional analysis at Moldova State University (1964–73). After moving to Israel, he joined Tel Aviv University (1974) and was at the Weizmann Institute at Rehovot. Since then he also had positions at Vrije Universiteit in Amsterdam (1983), as well as at the University of Calgary and the University of Maryland, College Park.

He founded the Integral equations and operator theory journal (1983).

Gohberg was the visionary and driving force of the International Workshop on Operator Theory and its Applications, or IWOTA, starting with its first meeting on August 1, 1981. He became a lifetime president of the IWOTA Steering Committee and a founder of the Springer / Birkhäuser Verlag book series Operator Theory: Advances and Applications (OTAA).

Gohberg was awarded the Humboldt Prize in 1992. He received honorary doctorates from the Darmstadt University of Technology in 1997; from the Vienna University of Technology in 2001; from West University of Timișoara in 2002; from Moldova State University, Chișinău, Moldova in 2002; from Alecu Russo State University, Bălți, Moldova in 2002; and from Technion, June 2008. He also was awarded the M.G. Krein Prize of the Ukrainian Academy of Sciences in 2008, and was elected SIAM Fellow in 2009.

He died in Ra'anana in 2009.

== Publications ==
Gohberg has authored near five hundred articles in his field. Books, a selection:

- 1986. Invariant subspaces of matrices with applications. With Peter Lancaster, and Leiba Rodman. . Vol. 51. SIAM, 1986.
- 2003. Basic classes of linear operators. With Rien Kaashoek and Seymour Goldberg. Springer, 2003.
- 2005. Convolution equations and projection methods for their solution. Izrail. With Aronovich Felʹdman. Vol. 41. AMS Bookstore.
- 2009. Matrix polynomials. With Peter Lancaster, and Leiba Rodman. Vol. 58. SIAM, 2009.

Articles, a selection:

- Gohberg, Israel C., and Kreĭn, Mark Grigor'evič. Introduction to the theory of linear nonselfadjoint operators in Hilbert space. Vol. 18. American Mathematical Soc., 1969.
- Gohberg, I; Kaashoek, M. A (1984). "Time varying linear systems with boundary conditions and integral operators. I. The transfer operator and its properties". Integral Equations and Operator Theory. 7 (3): 325. doi:10.1007/BF01208381. S2CID 118696780.
- Branges, Louis de (1994). "Book Review: Classes of linear operators, Volume 2". Bulletin of the American Mathematical Society. 31 (2): 236–244. doi:10.1090/S0273-0979-1994-00526-9.
