= Volker Mehrmann =

German mathematician (born 1955)

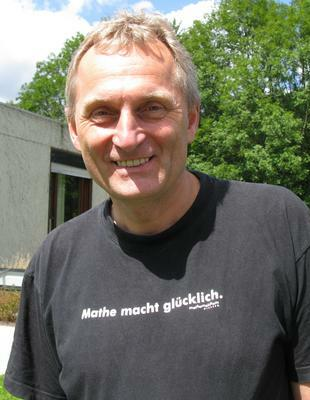
- Mehrmann at Oberwolfach, 2009
- Born: 24 April 1955 (age 71); Detmold
- Education: Bielefeld University
- Awards: AMS Fellow; Hans Schneider Prize in Linear Algebra; W. T. and Idalia Reid Prize
- Scientific career
- Fields: Numerical linear algebra; Control theory
- Workplaces: Technische Universität Berlin; Chemnitz University of Technology
- Doctoral advisor: Ludwig Elsner; Richard S. Varga
- Doctoral students: Peter Benner; Daniel Kressner

Volker Ludwig Mehrmann (born 1955) is a German mathematician known for research in numerical linear algebra, differential-algebraic equations, and control theory. He is on the editorial staffs of several journals, including Linear Algebra and Its Applications and Numerische Mathematik. From 2019 to 2022 he was president of the European Mathematical Society (EMS).

== Education and career ==
Mehrmann studied mathematics at Bielefeld University, where he earned his Diploma (equivalent to an undergraduate degree) in 1979. He completed his Ph.D. there in 1982 under the supervision of Ludwig F. Elsner, following a spell at Kent State University, where he worked under Richard S. Varga. His dissertation was "On classes of matrices containing M-matrices and hermitian positive semidefinite matrices". He also received his habilitation in 1987 from the same university.

From 1990 to 1992 Mehrmann was a Vertretungsprofessor (interim professor) at the RWTH Aachen University. From 1993 to 2000 he was a professor at the Chemnitz University of Technology. Since 2000 he has been a professor at the Institute for Mathematics at Technische Universität Berlin. From June 2008 to May 2016 he was the spokesperson for the Deutsche Forschungsgemeinschaft's mathematical center called Matheon. From January 2011 to December 2013 he was president of the Gesellschaft für Angewandte Mathematik und Mechanik (GAMM). In 2011 he received from the European Research Council (ERC) an advanced grant for modeling, simulation, and control of multiphysics systems.

== Awards and honors ==
Mehrmann is a member of the Deutschen Akademie der Technikwissenschaften (Acatech) and of Academia Europaea. In 2015 he gave the Gauss Lecture and in 2018 was awarded the W. T. and Idalia Reid Prize and in 2019 the Hans Schneider Prize in Linear Algebra. In 2022 he was named a Fellow of the American Mathematical Society "for contributions to scientific computing and numerical linear algebra, and service and leadership in the mathematical community".

== Selected publications ==
- Liesen, Jörg (2015). Linear Algebra. Springer Undergraduate Mathematics Series. Springer Cham. doi:10.1007/978-3-319-24346-7. ISBN 978-3-319-24344-3.
- Kunkel, Peter; Mehrmann, V. L. (2006). Differential-algebraic equations : analysis and numerical solution. Zürich, Switzerland: European Mathematical Society. ISBN 3-03719-017-5. OCLC 69903217.
- Schwarz, Hans-Rudolf; Köckler, Norbert (2004). Numerische Mathematik (in German). Wiesbaden. ISBN 978-3-322-96814-2. OCLC 1021377754.
- Mehrmann, Volker Ludwig (1991). The Autonomous Linear Quadratic Control Problem : Theory and Numerical Solution. Berlin, Heidelberg: Springer Berlin Heidelberg. ISBN 978-3-540-47482-1. OCLC 858924641.
