= Richard A. Brualdi =

American mathematician

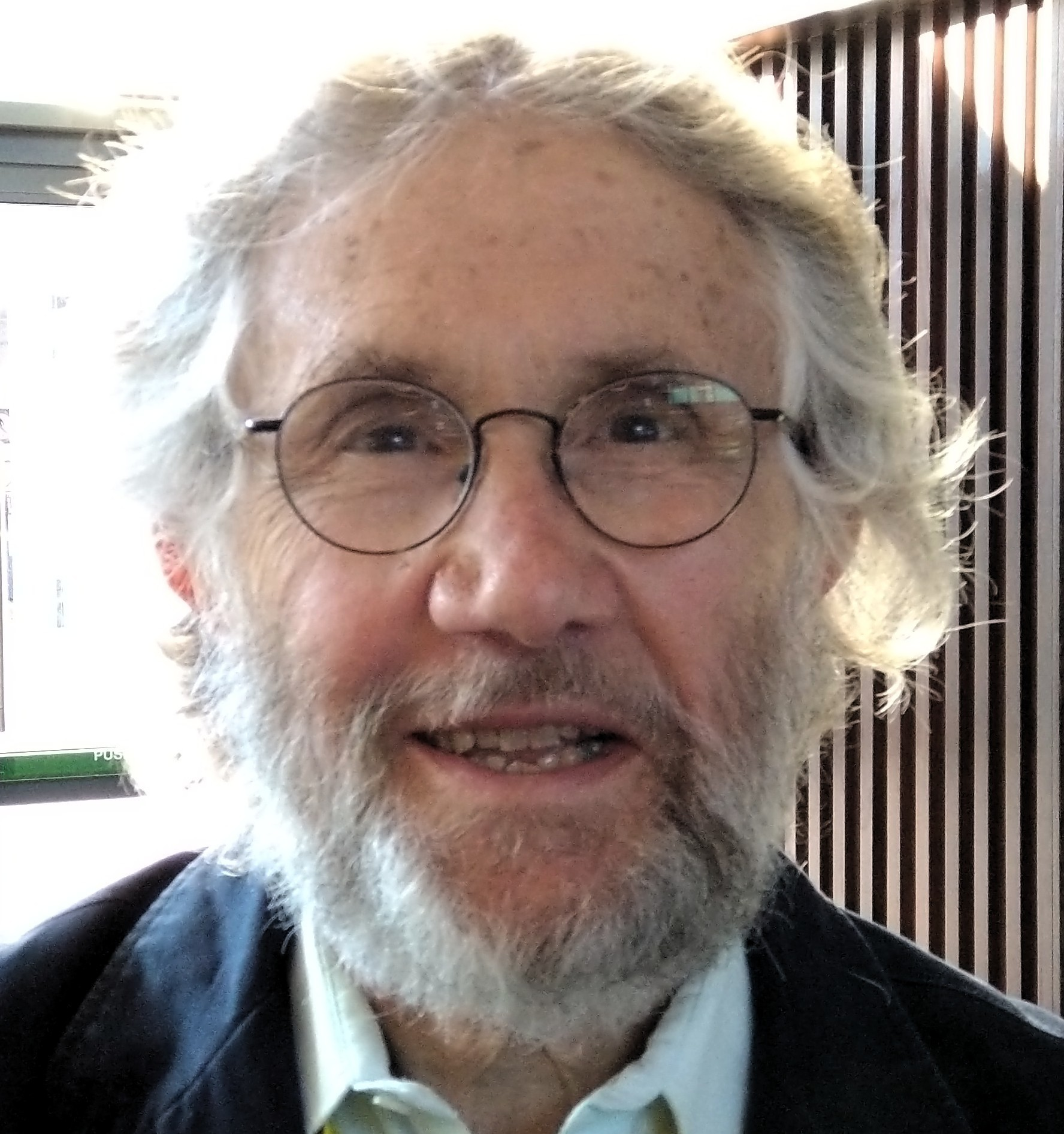
- Brualdi in 2022
- Born: September 2, 1939 (age 86); Derby, Connecticut, United States
- Other name: R.A. Brualdi
- Education: Syracuse University
- Known for: Matrix theory, Combinatorics, graph theory
- Awards: Euler Medal (2000), Hans Schneider Prize in Linear Algebra (2006)
- Scientific career
- Fields: Mathematics
- Workplaces: University of Wisconsin - Madison
- Doctoral students: Bryan Shader

Richard Anthony Brualdi is a professor emeritus of combinatorial mathematics at the University of Wisconsin–Madison.

Brualdi received his Ph.D. from Syracuse University in 1964; his advisor was H. J. Ryser. Brualdi is an Editor-in-Chief of the Electronic Journal of Combinatorics. He has over 200 publications in several mathematical journals. According to current on-line database of Mathematics Genealogy Project, Richard Brualdi has 37 Ph.D. students and 48 academic descendants. The concept of incidence coloring was introduced in 1993 by Brualdi and Massey.

He received the Euler medal from the Institute of Combinatorics and its Applications in 2000. In 2012, he was elected a fellow of the Society for Industrial and Applied Mathematics. That same year, he became an inaugural fellow of the American Mathematical Society.

== Books ==
- (with Herbert J. Ryser) Combinatorial Matrix Theory, Cambridge Univ. Press
- Richard A. Brualdi, Introductory Combinatorics, Prentice-Hall, Upper Saddle River, N.J.
- V. Pless, R. A. Brualdi, and W. C. Huffman, Handbook of Coding Theory, Elsevier Science, New York, 1998
- Brualdi, Richard A. (2006). Combinatorial Matrix Classes. Encyclopedia of Mathematics and Its Applications. Vol. 108. Cambridge: Cambridge University Press. ISBN 978-0-521-86565-4. Zbl 1106.05001.
- Richard A. Brualdi and Dragos Cvetkovic, A Combinatorial Approach to Matrix Theory and Its Applications, CRC Press, Boca Raton Fla., 2009.
- Richard A. Brualdi and Bryan Shader, Matrices of Sign-Solvable Linear Systems, Cambridge Tracts in Mathematics, Vol. 116, Cambridge Univ. Press, 1995.
- Richard A. Brualdi, The Mutually Beneficial Relationship Between Graphs and Matrices, American Mathematical Society, CBMS Series, 2012.

== Selected articles ==
- Brualdi, Richard A. (1966). "On the permanent and maximal characteristic root of a nonnegative matrix". Proc. Amer. Math. Soc. 17 (6): 1413–1416. doi:10.1090/s0002-9939-1966-0204444-2. MR 0204444.
- Brualdi, Richard A. (1969). "A very general theorem on systems of distinct representatives". Trans. Amer. Math. Soc. 140: 149–160. doi:10.1090/s0002-9947-1969-0249304-3. MR 0249304.
- Brualdi, Richard A. (1969). "An extension of Banach's mapping theorem". Proc. Amer. Math. Soc. 20 (2): 520–526. doi:10.1090/s0002-9939-1969-0236029-9. MR 0236029.
- Brualdi, Richard A. (1971). "Induced matroids". Proc. Amer. Math. Soc. 29 (2): 213–221. doi:10.1090/s0002-9939-1971-0289335-5. MR 0289335.
- Brualdi, Richard A. (1974). "Weighted join semilattices and transversal matroids". Trans. Amer. Math. Soc. 191: 317–328. doi:10.1090/s0002-9947-1974-0382039-7. MR 0382039.
- Brualdi, Richard A. (1974). "On fundamental transversal matroids". Proc. Amer. Math. Soc. 45: 151–156. doi:10.1090/s0002-9939-1974-0387087-4. MR 0387087.
- Brualdi, Richard A. (1974). "The DAD theorem for arbitrary row sums". Proc. Amer. Math. Soc. 45 (2): 189–194. doi:10.1090/s0002-9939-1974-0354737-8. MR 0354737.
- with Jeffrey A. Ross: Brualdi, Richard A.; Ross, Jeffrey A. (1980). "Invariant sets for classes of matrices of zeros and ones". Proc. Amer. Math. Soc. 80 (4): 706–710. doi:10.1090/s0002-9939-1980-0587961-2. MR 0587961.
- with J. Csima: Brualdi, R. A.; Csima, J. (1976). "On the plane term rank of a three dimensional matrix". Proc. Amer. Math. Soc. 54: 471–473. doi:10.1090/s0002-9939-1976-0387319-4. MR 0387319.
- with Bo Lian Liu: Brualdi, Richard A.; Liu, Bo Lian (1991). "Fully indecomposable exponents of primitive matrices". Proc. Amer. Math. Soc. 112 (4): 1193–1201. doi:10.1090/s0002-9939-1991-1065941-8. MR 1065941.
