= Linear Algebra and Its Applications =

- Discipline: Mathematics
- Language: English
- Edited by: Richard A. Brualdi, Volker Mehrmann, Peter Semrl

Publication details
- History: 1968-present
- Publisher: Elsevier
- Frequency: Biweekly
- Open access: Hybrid
- Impact factor: 1.401 (2020)

Standard abbreviations
- ISO 4: Linear Algebra Its Appl.
- MathSciNet: Linear Algebra Appl.

Indexing
- CODEN: LAAPAW
- ISSN: 0024-3795
- LCCN: 75000487
- OCLC no.: 859638087

Links
- Journal homepage

Linear Algebra and Its Applications is a biweekly peer-reviewed mathematics journal published by Elsevier and covering matrix theory and finite-dimensional linear algebra.

== History ==
The journal was established in January 1968 with A.J. Hoffman, A.S. Householder, A.M. Ostrowski, H. Schneider, and O. Taussky-Todd

as founding editors-in-chief. The current editors-in-chief are Richard A. Brualdi (University of Wisconsin at Madison), Volker Mehrmann (Technische Universität Berlin), and Peter Semrl (University of Ljubljana).

== Abstracting and indexing ==
The journal is abstracted and indexed in:

- ABI/Inform
- Cambridge Scientific Abstracts
- Current Contents/Physical, Chemical & Earth Sciences
- Inspec
- Mathematical Reviews
- Science Citation Index
- Scopus
- Zentralblatt MATH

According to the Journal Citation Reports, the journal has a 2020 impact factor of 1.401.
