= Levitas =

Levitas is a surname of eastern ashkenazi origins, coming from a Greek form of Levy. Notable people with the surname include:

- Andrew Levitas (born 1977), American artist
- Elliott H. Levitas (1930–2022), American politician and lawyer
- Eugene Levitas (born 1972), Soviet-Israeli composer
- Ilya Levitas (1931–2014), Soviet journalist and humanitarian figure
- Irving Levitas (1910–1987), American Jewish scholar
- Maurice Levitas (1917–2001), Irish academic and communist
- Max Levitas (1915–2018), Irish communist activist
- Ruth Levitas (born 1949), British sociologist
- Sol Levitas (1894–1961), Russian-American socialist and magazine editor
- Valery I. Levitas, Ukrainian material scientist
