= ZMM =

ZMM may refer to:

- ZeniMax Media, a video game holding
- Zen and the Art of Motorcycle Maintenance (more commonly abbreviated as ZAMM)
- Zygomaticus minor muscle
