= Massoud Kaviany =

Iranian-American mechanical engineer

- Born: 1948 (age 77–78); Tehran, Iran
- Citizenship: United States
- Education: University of Illinois Chicago (B.S., M.S.); University of California, Berkeley (Ph.D.)
- Known for: Heat transfer physics; heat transfer in porous media
- Spouse: Mitra Kaviany (m. 1985)
- Children: Saara Kaviany, Parisa Kaviany
- Scientific career
- Fields: Mechanical engineering, Applied physics
- Workplaces: University of Michigan
- Doctoral advisor: R. A. Seban
- Other academic advisors: J. P. Hartnett
- Website: Faculty page

Massoud Kaviany is an Iranian-American mechanical engineer who has worked on heat transfer fundamentals, heat transfer physics, and multiscale energy-transport phenomena. He is a professor in the Department of Mechanical Engineering and the Applied Physics Program at the University of Michigan.

== Early life and education ==
Kaviany was born in 1948 in Tehran, Iran, and moved to the United States in 1968. He earned a B.S. (1973) and M.S. (1974) in energy engineering from the University of Illinois Chicago. He completed his Ph.D. in mechanical engineering at the University of California, Berkeley in 1979 under the supervision of R. A. Seban.

== Career ==
Kaviany worked as a staff scientist at Lawrence Berkeley National Laboratory from 1979 to 1980. In 1981, he joined the University of Wisconsin–Milwaukee as an assistant professor, becoming associate professor in 1985. He moved to the University of Michigan in 1986, where he became full professor in 1992.

== Research ==
=== Phonon transport ===
Kaviany's work on lattice vibrations addresses phonon scattering, mean free paths, and thermal conductivity in crystalline and amorphous solids, with applications to thermoelectric materials. He advanced a "phonovoltaic" concept, a p–n junction capable of converting hot optical phonons into electrical power, and introduced "phonocatalysis," in which atomic-scale vibrations drive molecular dissociation at surfaces.

His group also carried measurements of thermal conductivity in metal–organic frameworks, supported by classical molecular-dynamics simulation.

=== Electron transport and energy conversion ===
Kaviany has conducted parallel investigations into electronic transport, electron–phonon coupling, and nanoscale heat transfer, particularly for thermoelectric devices and micro–thermoelectric coolers. Contributions include a melting-induced thermal-conductivity switch, analysis of interflake thermal conductance of graphene, and the concept of heterobarrier phonon recycling.

=== Fluid–particle transport and phase change ===
His work has informed water management in fuel-cell electrolyte layers, boiling and critical heat flux, and the enhancement of thermal conductance using porous coatings.

== Books ==
- Principles of Heat Transfer in Porous Media (Springer, 1991; 2nd ed., 1995)
- Principles of Convective Heat Transfer (Springer, 1994; 2nd ed., 2001)
- Principles of Heat Transfer (Wiley, 2001), later republished as Essentials of Heat Transfer (Cambridge University Press, 2011)
- Heat Transfer Physics (Cambridge University Press, 2008; 2nd ed., 2014)

== Honors and awards ==
- Life Time Fellow, American Society of Mechanical Engineers (ASME) (1992)
- Shared the ASME Heat Transfer Memorial Award (Science) (2002)
- ASME James Harry Potter Gold Medal (2010)
- ASME Heat Transfer Division 75th Anniversary Medal (2013)
- Fellow, American Physical Society (2011)
- Fellow, American Society of Thermal and Fluids Engineers (2020)
