= Chiara Daraio =

Italian-American materials scientist

Chiara Daraio is an Italian-American materials scientist and acoustical engineer. She is the G. Bradford Jones Professor of Mechanical Engineering and Applied Physics at the California Institute of Technology and Director of Research at Meta.

== Contributions ==
Daraio's research develops new materials that combine intriguing chemical composition with a designed architecture at the micro- and macro-scales. Some of her contributions include a version of Newton's cradle that can generate "sound bullets"—sound waves focused tightly enough to disrupt matter; walls filled with ball bearings that can pass sound in only one direction; 3d-printed self-assembling rolling robots; solar panels for space missions made of a shape-memory polymer that unfolds in sunlight; and heat-sensitive artificial skin made out of pectin for both robotic and prosthetic uses. Her work has applications in soft robotics, medical devices, and vibration absorption.

== Education and career ==
Daraio earned her undergraduate degree, or laurea, in mechanical engineering from the Marche Polytechnic University in 2001, and a Ph.D. in materials science and engineering in 2006 from the University of California, San Diego. Her dissertation, Design of materials: Configurations for enhanced phononic and electronic properties, was jointly supervised by Professors Sungho Jin and Vitali F. Nesterenko.

She joined the California Institute of Technology (Caltech) faculty in 2006, and has remained there since with a leave from 2013 to 2016, to take a chair of Mechanics and Materials at ETH Zurich. At Caltech, she was initially in the Aeronautics and Applied Physics department, where she was promoted to full professor in 2010; she then moved to the Department of Mechanical Engineering and Applied Physics in 2016. She currently serves as the G. Bradford Jones Professor in the Division of Engineering and Applied Science and serves as the Caltech Director of the NSF Center to Stream Healthcare in Place (C2SHIP).

== Recognitions ==
In 2018, Daraio won the UC San Diego Mechanical and Aerospace Engineering Outstanding Alumna Award, "for outstanding achievements in mechanical metamaterials and materials science".

Daraio received a Presidential Early Career Award for Scientists and Engineers (PECASE) from President Obama in 2012.

She was elected as a Sloan Research Fellow in 2011.

In 2010, Popular Science recognized Daraio as one of its “Brilliant 10” and she received an ONR Young Investigator Award.

She won the NSF CAREER award in 2009.

Daraio also won the Felice De Carli Medal of the Italian Metallurgical Society in 2006, and the Richard von Mises Prize of the Gesellschaft für Angewandte Mathematik und Mechanik in 2008.
