= Tatjana Stykel =

Russian mathematician

Tatjana Stykel is a Russian mathematician who works as a professor of computational mathematics in the Institute of Mathematics of the University of Augsburg in Germany. Her research interests include numerical linear algebra, control theory, and differential-algebraic systems of equations.

== Education and career ==
Stykel earned bachelor's and master's degrees from Novosibirsk State University in 1994 and 1996. After postgraduate study as a research institute at the Humboldt University of Berlin and Chemnitz University of Technology, she earned a doctorate (Dr. rer. nat.) from Technische Universität Berlin in 2002, and a habilitation from the same university in 2008. Her doctoral dissertation, Analysis and Numerical Solution of Generalized Lyapunov Equation, was supervised by Volker Mehrmann.

After completing her doctorate, she was a postdoctoral researcher at the University of Calgary, and then a researcher and guest professor at Technische Universität Berlin from 2003 until 2011, when she took her current position in Augsburg.

== Recognition ==
In 2003, Stykel was one of the Second Prize winners of the Leslie Fox Prize for Numerical Analysis. She won the Richard von Mises Prize of the Gesellschaft für Angewandte Mathematik und Mechanik in 2007.
