= Richard von Mises Prize =

Prize in the field of Applied Mathematics and Mechanics

The Richard von Mises Prize is awarded annually by the International Association of Applied Mathematics and Mechanics (GAMM). Since its inception in 1989, the award is given to a young scientist (not older than 36) for outstanding scientific achievements in the field of Applied Mathematics and Mechanics. The prize is presented during the opening ceremony of the GAMM Annual Meeting where the winner will present his research in a plenary talk. The prize aims to reward and encourage young scientists whose research represents a major advancement in the field of Applied Mathematics and Mechanics.

Richard von Mises was an Austrian-American mathematician who worked among others on numerical mathematics, solid mechanics, fluid mechanics, statistics and probability theory.

== Winners ==
The prize winners have included:

- Alexander Mielke (1989)
- Tobias von Petersdorff (1991)
- Peter Fotin (1992)
- Carsten Carstensen (1993)
- Michael Fey (1993)
- Christiane Tretter (1993)
- Franz Marketz (1996)
- Hermann Nirschel (1997)
- Guido Schneider (1997)
- Valery Levitas (1998)
- Michael Ruzicka (1999)
- Peter Eberhard (2000)
- Udo Nackenhorst (2000)
- Martin Rein (2000)
- Herbert Steinrück (2001)
- Britta Nestler (2002)
- Xue-Nong Chen (2002)
- Barbara Niethammer (2003)
- Mark David Groves (2004)
- Bernd Rainer Noack (2005)
- José A. Carrillo (2006)
- Michael Dumbser (2007)
- Tatjana Stykel (2007)
- Chiara Daraio (2008)
- Daniel Balzani (2009)
- Bernd Schmidt (2009)
- Volker Gravemeier (2010)
- Ulisse Stefanelli (2010)
- Oliver Röhrle (2011)
- Swantje Bargmann (2012)
- Dennis M. Kochmann (2013)
- Christian Linder (2013)
- Irwin Yousept (2014)
- Siddhartha Mishra (2015)
- Dominik Schillinger (2015)
- Josef Kiendl (2016)
- Martin Stoll (2016)
- Benjamin Klusemann (2017)
- Christian Kuehn (2017)
- Marc Avila (2018)
- Dietmar Gallistl (2019)
- Philipp Junker (2019)
- Fadi Aldakheel (2020)
- Elisa Davoli (2020)
- Thomas Berger (2021)
- Silvia Budday (2021)
- Matti Schneider (2022)
- Ruming Zhang (2023)
- Patrik Knopf (2024)
- Marco Salvalaglio (2024)
- Kevin Linka (2025)
- Jane Bae (2025)
- Andrea Thomann (2026)
- Karl Kalina (2026)

== See also ==
- List of mathematics awards
