= Bögli =

Bögli is a Swiss German surname. Notable people with the surname include:

- Alfred Bögli (1912–1998), Swiss geographer, mineraloger, and speleologist
- Arnold Bögli (born 1897), Swiss wrestler
- Hans Bögli, Swiss archeologist of Aventicum and namesake of its Professor Hans Bögli Museum
- Katrin Bögli, member of Swiss rock band Patent Ochsner
- Noah Bögli (born 1996), Swiss cyclist
- Sabine Bögli, Swiss mathematician
