= Lynching of Raymond Gunn =

1931 lynching in Missouri, United States

Raymond Gunn (January 11, 1904 – January 12, 1931) was an American man killed by a mob in Maryville, Missouri after being accused of killing a white woman.

The case received massive national publicity because it occurred outside the Southern "lynch belt," because of its brazen and planned nature, and because the county sheriff did not activate the Missouri National Guard troops that had been specifically deployed to prevent the lynching.

The case was frequently invoked in the unsuccessful attempt to pass the Wagner-Costigan Act during the presidency of Franklin Roosevelt, which would have made it a federal crime for law enforcement officials to refuse to try to prevent a lynching.

== Early life ==
Raymond Gunn was the oldest of the eight children of Michael and Maymie Gunn, a farming family in Maryville. In the 1920 census, the family is described as mulatto. In the 1930 census, Raymond Gunn is described as laborer and widower.

In September 1925, Gunn was convicted of the attempted rape of a student at what is now Northwest Missouri State University, after accosting the young woman on a rural lane outside of Maryville. The student claimed that Gunn stuck his thumbs into her mouth to keep her from screaming. Gunn never confessed to the crime and claimed to have been beaten while in custody. He was released from prison on January 28, 1928.

Following his release, Gunn married a local woman and moved with her to Omaha. However, his wife died of pneumonia, and he returned to Maryville, where he made a living as a hunter.

== Murder of Velma Colter ==
On December 16, 1930, a 20-year-old teacher, Velma Colter, daughter of a local farmer, was murdered in the one-room Garrett schoolhouse, (40°19′56.22″N 94°54′40.05″W) a mile southwest of Maryville. When she failed to return home, her parents went to the school. They found her partly undressed body in a pool of blood inside the school; a bloody footprint left by her killer was on the floor.

Because of his earlier conviction, Raymond Gunn was immediately suspected. A farmer reported he had seen a black man near the school. The sheriff arrested several black men matching the description, before he found Gunn on December 18. Gunn had blood stains on his shirt (he claimed it was rabbit blood), and his footprint matched the one at the crime scene. Moreover, Gunn had a severe bite mark on his thumb, recalling the student's description of the 1925 rape attempt.

Gunn finally confessed, saying he had entered the school with a hedge club after seeing the teacher outside with a coal bucket. She resisted his assault, biting his thumb, so he hit her with the club. She struck him with the coal bucket, and he hit her again and again, killing her. He then stabbed her.

== Lynch mob atmosphere ==
Anger and talk of a lynching began immediately after Gunn was taken into custody, and crowds began to assemble in Maryville. Gunn was transferred for safety to the Buchanan County, Missouri jail, 45 miles south in St. Joseph, Missouri. Crowds formed there as well, and the sheriff ordered a truck mounted with a machine gun to be backed to the door. The gunner appeared to aim the weapon at the crowd, though he said he was just oiling it, which caused the crowd to disperse.

Gunn was transferred a second time, 100 miles south of Maryville to Kansas City, Missouri. On December 26, at 3:30 a.m., Gunn returned to Maryville for arraignment, and was then immediately taken back to Kansas City.

Velma Colter's mother was quoted as saying she could not bear a trial and would not testify. Her oldest son, Floyd Colter, had been killed in France during World War I.

== The lynching ==
Gunn's court date was set for January 12. The Nodaway County prosecuting attorney insisted Gunn would get a fair trial and appealed (along with Maryville business leaders) to Missouri's governor, Henry S. Caulfield, to deploy the National Guard to prevent an anticipated lynching attempt. Caulfield complied and 60 guardsmen were ordered at 7:30 a.m. to stand by at the National Guard a block north of the courthouse (today's Maryville Public Library). However, by law, the National Guard could only be deployed at the written request of the sheriff, which was never made. Sheriff Harvey England later claimed he did not call up the guardsmen because he did not want them injured.

By this point a large crowd occupied the Maryville square, between the jail block to the northeast and the Nodaway County, Missouri courthouse. The sheriff was transporting Gunn by car, and he drove directly into the mob. When he opened the door, the sheriff was pulled aside and Gunn was dragged out of the car. Witnesses later said the mob leader told the sheriff, "Either you move out of the way or die with this man, either way he's going to die today."

Gunn was marched south down Main Street through the Maryville streets, avoiding the National Guard. After an hour and a half, Gunn and the crowd reached at the Garrett schoolhouse. Gunn's ears and nose were bleeding from being beaten on the way. The schoolhouse was emptied and all furniture placed on the lawn. The mob was estimated to have grown to between 2,000 and 4,000. Gunn was taken inside the schoolhouse, where he is reported to have confessed his guilt again, claiming he had an accomplice named "Shike" Smith.

Gunn was moved to the roof and tied to a ridge pole. Gunn and the building were then doused with gasoline. The mob leader, identified only as the "man in a red coat", threw a lighted piece of paper into the building. Gunn screamed but once and appeared lifeless in 11 minutes.

A reporter for the St. Joseph Gazette gave the following gruesome description:

He twisted and revealed a huge blister ballooning on his left upper arm. Pieces of his skin blew away to the wind as the blistering heat became more intense and soon his torso was splotched with white patches of exposed flesh. His hair burned like a torch for moment then his head sagged. His body writhed. It took the appearance of a mummy.

The building's roof collapsed within 16 minutes. Burnt fragments of the schoolhouse were taken by the crowd as souvenirs.

== Aftermath ==
No charges were ever filed in the lynching. Attempts to identify the "man in the red coat" have been answered by the claim he was an outsider. However, newspapers said all the others were local.

Gunn's lynching was universally condemned by newspapers across the United States. The Atlanta Constitution published an editorial cartoon with the caption of "The Torch of Civilization in Missouri."

After the brutal incident, Maryville residents heard rumors that African Americans from Kansas City were coming to attack the city in retaliation. Townsmen reportedly set up machine gun nests on Main Street. The Gunn family's home was also burned.

The 1930 census showed 90 African Americans living in Maryville, with 35 enrolled in the town's school. By 1931, the number of African Americans had dropped to six, and eventually almost all left the town in fear.

Rabbi Samuel S. Mayerberg accused authorities of allowing the lynching to occur.

Franklin Roosevelt campaigned in 1932, saying he was going to take steps to stop all lynchings. Ironically, he did not back the proposed Anti-Lynching Bill of 1937, though he did add a Civil Rights Section to the Justice Department.
