= Samuel S. Mayerberg =

American rabbi (1892–1964)

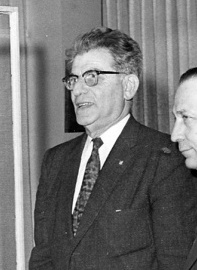
- Mayerberg in 1960; his assistant, Irving Levitas, stands to his right.

Personal life
- Born: Samuel Spier Mayerberg; May 8, 1892 Goldsboro, North Carolina, US
- Died: November 21, 1964 (aged 72)
- Education: University of Cincinnati; Hebrew Union College – Jewish Institute of Religion

Religious life
- Religion: Judaism
- Church: Temple Beth El; Temple Israel; The Temple, Congregation B'nai Jehudah

Samuel Spier Mayerberg (May 8, 1892 – November 21, 1964) was an American rabbi who was active in Kansas City, Missouri and fought against the city's control by political boss Tom Pendergast.

== Early life and education ==
Mayerberg was born in Goldsboro, North Carolina, on May 8, 1892, to rabbi Julius L. Mayerberg. He graduated high school in 1908, and studied at the University of Cincinnati and the Hebrew Union College – Jewish Institute of Religion—also his father's alma mater—graduating from the latter in 1917 and pursued ministry—a wish from his mother to him and his brother, who went on to become a physician.

== Career ==
Also in 1917, Mayerberg married Gertrude Rothschild, and they moved to Detroit. There, he worked at Temple Beth El as an assistant. From 1920 to 1928, he led Temple Israel, in Dayton, Ohio. While in Ohio, he was president of the Montgomery County chapter of the American Red Cross, helped build an orphanage, and established the Ohio Society for the Welfare of the Mentally Ill.

From his arrival to Kansas City in 1925, until his retirement in 1960, Mayerberg led The Temple, Congregation B'nai Jehudah. An outspoken activist, he gave a 1929 speech at the University of Missouri which led to the firing of multiple professors for questioning the sexuality of sociology students, as well as accusing authorities of allowing the lynching of Raymond Gunn in 1931. He also defended Joe Hershon, a Jewish man sentenced to death for murder, and comforted him after unsuccessfully appealing his verdict.

Mayerberg was critical of the actions of John Lazia, Henry F. McElroy and Tom Pendergast, and beginning on May 21, 1932, spoke on it at clubs. He gained support among the public, unsuccessfully running in the 1934 Kansas City mayoral election. To remain sade, he left Kansas City for a time, hired bodyguards, and slept with a pistol. He survived a drive-by shooting from four shooters in 1932, due to fitting his vehicle with bulletproof windows. He was an organizer of the National Youth Administration in 1935.

After Pendergast was convicted in the 1940s, Mayerberg taught theology classes at the University of Missouri–Kansas City and the University of Kansas, and was a recipient of the Jacob Lorie Service Award. In 1957, he was later appointed to the Kansas City Police Department Board of Commissioners by governor James T. Blair Jr. On May 8, 1960, he was a guest at former president Harry S. Truman's 77th birthday party, at the Muehlebach Hotel. He died on November 21, 1964, aged 72, of a heart attack.
