= Christiane Tretter =

German mathematician and mathematical physicist

- Awards: Richard von Mises Prize

Academic background
- Education: University of Regensburg
- Thesis: Asymptotische Randbedingungen für Entwicklungssätze bei Randeigenwertproblemen zu $N(y) = \lambda P(y)$ mit $\lambda$-abhängigen Randbedingungen (1992)
- Doctoral advisor: Reinhard Mennicken

Academic work
- Discipline: Mathematics
- Sub-discipline: Mathematical physics
- Institutions: University of Bern; University of Bremen; University of Leicester
- Doctoral students: Sabine Bögli
- Main interests: Differential operators Spectral theory

Christiane Tretter is a German mathematician and mathematical physicist who works as a professor in the Mathematical Institute (MAI) of the University of Bern in Switzerland, and as co-director of the institute. Her research area in applied analysis includes, in particular, spectral theory and differential operators.

== Education and career ==
Tretter studied mathematics, with a minor in physics, at the University of Regensburg, earning a diploma in 1989, a Ph.D. in 1992, and a habilitation in 1998. Her doctoral dissertation, Asymptotische Randbedingungen für Entwicklungssätze bei Randeigenwertproblemen zu $N(y) = \lambda P(y)$ mit $\lambda$-abhängigen Randbedingungen, was supervised by Reinhard Mennicken.

She became a lecturer at the University of Leicester in 2000, moved to the University of Bremen as a professor in 2002, and took her present position as full professor at the University of Bern in 2006.

Since 2008 she has been editor-in-chief of the journal Integral Equations and Operator Theory.. Having served as vice-president of the Swiss Mathematical Society, SMS, in 2024/25, she was elected president of SMS in 2026.

== Books ==
Tretter is the author of two mathematical monographs, Spectral Theory of Block Operator Matrices and Applications (2008) and On Lambda-Nonlinear-Boundary-Eigenvalue-Problems (1993), and of two textbooks in analysis.

== Recognition ==
Tretter was awarded the Richard von Mises Prize of the Gesellschaft für Angewandte Mathematik und Mechanik, GAMM, in 1995. She became honorary member of the Swedish Mathematical Society in 2025.
