= Integral Equations and Operator Theory =

Scientific journal

- Discipline: Functional analysis
- Language: English
- Edited by: Christiane Tretter

Publication details
- History: 1978—present
- Publisher: Springer
- Frequency: Quarterly
- Impact factor: 1 (2025)

Standard abbreviations
- ISO 4: Integral Equ. Oper. Theory

Indexing
- ISSN: 0378-620X (print); 1420-8989 (web)

Links
- Journal homepage; Online access; Online archive

Integral Equations and Operator Theory is a peer-reviewed scientific journal published quarterly by Springer Science+Business Media. Established in 1978, it covers integral equations and operator theory, as well as their applications to engineering and other mathematical sciences.

The founding editor-in-chief of the journal, in 1978, was Israel Gohberg. Its current editor-in-chief is Christiane Tretter (University of Bern).

== Abstracting and indexing ==
The journal is abstracted and indexed in:

- Current Contents/Physical, Chemical & Earth Sciences
- MathSciNet
- ProQuest databases
- Science Citation Index Expanded
- Scopus
- zbMATH

According to the Journal Citation Reports, the journal has a 2025 impact factor of 1.
