= Heike Fassbender =

German mathematician

Heike Fassbender is a German mathematician specializing in numerical linear algebra. She is a professor in the Institute for Computational Mathematics at the Technical University of Braunschweig, and the president for the 2017–2019 term of the Gesellschaft für Angewandte Mathematik und Mechanik (GAMM, the International Association of Applied Mathematics and Mechanics).

== Education and career ==
Fassbender earned a master's degree in computer science at the University at Buffalo, and completed her Ph.D. at the University of Bremen in 1992. Her dissertation, Numerische Verfahren zur diskreten trigonometrischen Polynomapproximation, was jointly supervised by Angelika Bunse-Gerstner and Ludwig F. Elsner.

Fassbender moved to the Technical University of Munich in 2000. She joined the Technical University of Braunschweig faculty in 2002, and was vice president for teaching, studies, and further education at the university from 2008 to 2012.

== Book ==
Fassbender is the author of the book Symplectic Methods for the Symplectic Eigenproblem (Kluwer, 2002).

== Professional service ==
As president of GAMM, Fassbender became the first woman to lead GAMM. As well as her presidency of GAMM, Fassbender was appointed for a four-year term on the German Accreditation Council in 2018. Moreover, she is treasurer of the International Council for Industrial and Applied Mathematics (ICIAM) is a worldwide organisation for professional applied mathematics societies, and for other societies with a significant interest in industrial or applied mathematics. January 1st, 2023, Fassbender is elected a chair member of the SIAM Council.
