= Heat transfer physics =

Branch of physics

Heat transfer physics describes the kinetics of energy storage, transport, and energy transformation by principal energy carriers: phonons (lattice vibration waves), electrons, fluid particles, and photons. Heat is defined as thermal energy in transit resulting from a spatial temperature distribution. Thermal energy is stored in the temperature-dependent motion of particles, including electrons, atomic nuclei, individual atoms, and molecules. Heat is transferred to and from matter by the principal energy carriers. The state of energy stored within matter, or transported by the carriers, is described by a combination of classical, quantum, and statistical mechanics. The energy is converted through interaction processes among various carriers. When these principal energy carriers are not in equilibrium, they are transported or converted toward an equilibrium distribution identified by carrier properties and statistical mechanics as $f^o_i$ (i = p, e, f, ph corresponding to phonon, electron, fluid particle, and photon, respectively). The heat transfer processes are governed by the rates (or kinetics) at which various related physical phenomena occur, such as (for example) the frequency of particle collisions in classical mechanics. These states and kinetics together determine the heat transfer, i.e., the net rate of energy storage or transport. Governing these process from the atomic level (atom or molecule length scale) to the macroscale are the laws of thermodynamics, including conservation of energy.

== Principal energy carriers ==
Variation of equilibrium particle distribution function with respect to energy ($f^o_i$) for different energy carriers (i = p, e, f, and ph, corresponding to phonons, electrons, fluid particles, and photons, respectively).

=== Phonon ===
A phonon is a quantized mode of vibration occurring in rigid crystal lattices. In classical mechanics, any lattice vibration can be decomposed into a superposition of non-localized normal modes. When these modes are analyzed using quantum mechanics, they are found to possess particle-like properties and are classified as quasiparticles. The energy (E_{p}) and momentum (P_{p}) of a phonon are defined as E_{p} = ħω_{p} and P_{p} = ħ κ_{p}, where ħ is the reduced Planck constant, ω_{p} is the angular frequency and κ_{p} is the wavevector; the relationship between these two variables is known as the dispersion relation. Because phonons are indistinguishable quasiparticles with zero spin, they are considered bosons, and their equilibrium distribution follows Bose–Einstein distribution. Phonons are primary thermal energy carriers that contribute to heat capacity (sensible heat storage) and conductive heat transfer in the condensed phase. Furthermore, they play a critical role in thermal energy conversion through interactions with electrons and fluid particles.

Animation of Atomic-Level Heat Transfer between Free Electron and Lattice (ordered atoms in solid) Vibration (Phonon)

=== Electron ===
An electron is a subatomic elementary particle with a negative elementary electric charge. Beyond their role as charge carriers, electrons are primary carriers of thermal energy transport in condensed matter. In particular, they are the dominant thermal transport carriers in metallic materials. However, at room temperature, the electronic contribution to thermal energy storage (heat capacity) is significantly lower than that of phonons. Due to their extremely small mass, electrons exhibit prominent wave-like characteristics. As particles with half-integer spin, they obey the Pauli exclusion principle and are classified as fermions; consequently, their equilibrium occupancy follows the Fermi-Dirac distribution. The state of electrons within a crystal is described by their band structure, which defines the relationship between energy (E_{e}) and wavevector (κ_{e}). Electrons engage in various interaction kinetics with other principal energy carriers, including photons (electromagnetic waves), phonons (lattice vibrations), and fluid particles, all of which are central to thermal energy conversion processes.

=== Fluid particle ===
A fluid particle is the smallest unit (atom or molecule) in a fluid phase (gas, liquid, or plasma) that can be defined without breaking chemical bonds. The total energy of a fluid particle is categorized into potential, electronic, translational, vibrational, and rotational components. Thermal energy storage within a fluid particle occurs through temperature-dependent particle motions, specifically translational, vibrational, and rotational energies. Electronic energy is typically only considered if the temperature is high enough to cause ionization, dissociation, or other electronic transitions. According to the Hamiltonian, the energy state (E_{f}) of a fluid particle is quantized. However, fluid particles are generally treated as classical particles due to their large momentum and extremely short de Broglie wavelengths; consequently, their equilibrium distribution follows Maxwell–Boltzmann (MB) statistics. Fluid particles interact with other principal energy carriers. Vibrational or rotational modes, which possess relatively high energy, can be excited or decay through interactions with photons. Gas lasers utilize the interaction kinetics between fluid particles and photons, and laser cooling has been applied in CO_{2} gas laser systems. Furthermore, fluid particles can be adsorbed onto solid surfaces via physisorption or chemisorption. In these cases, the frustrated vibrational modes of the adsorbates decay by creating electron-hole (e^{−}-h^{+}) pairs or phonons. These interaction rates are determined through ab initio calculations and the application of Fermi's Golden Rule.

=== Photon ===
A photon is the quantum of electromagnetic (EM) radiation and serves as the primary energy carrier for radiative heat transfer. While classical EM waves are governed by Maxwell's equations, the quantization of the EM field is necessary to explain phenomena such as blackbody radiation and to resolve the ultraviolet catastrophe. The energy of a photon with angular frequency ω_{ph} is defined as E_{ph} = ħω_{ph}. Photons exhibit a linear dispersion relation, where frequency is directly proportional to the wavevector (κ_{ph}); consequently, the phase and group speeds are equal to the photon speed (u_{ph}), i.e., u_{ph} = dω_{ph}/dκ_{ph} = ω_{ph}/κ_{ph}. The propagation speed of a photon in a vacuum is a universal constant. As bosons, photons follow the Bose–Einstein distribution function (f_{ph}). Photons possess the widest range of energy among the principal carriers and are central to various energy conversion processes. They interact with electric and magnetic entities, such as electric dipoles (which may be excited by optical phonons or fluid particle vibrations) or transition dipole moments during electronic transitions. In heat transfer physics, these interaction kinetics are typically treated using an interaction Hamiltonian and perturbation theory, specifically Fermi's Golden Rule.

== Length and time scales ==
Kinetics of atomic-level energy transport and transition interaction

Length-time scale regimes for ab initio, MD, Boltzmann transport, and macroscopic treatments of heat transfer.

Thermophysical properties of matter and the kinetics of interaction and energy exchange among the principal carriers are fundamentally determined by their atomic-level configuration and interaction. Transport properties, such as thermal conductivity, are calculated from these atomic-level attributes using classical and quantum physics. Quantum states of principal carriers (e.g., momentum and energy) are derived from the Schrödinger equation (called first-principles or ab initio) and their interaction rates (for kinetics) are calculated using the quantum states and the quantum perturbation theory (formulated as the Fermi golden rule). A variety of ab initio (Latin for from the beginning) solvers (software) exist to perform these calculations (e.g., ABINIT, CASTEP, Gaussian, Q-Chem, Quantum ESPRESSO, SIESTA, VASP, WIEN2k). Because electrons in the inner shells (core) are not involved in heat transfer, computational costs can be significantly reduced by employing proper approximations about the inner-shells electrons.

Due to intensive computational demands, fully quantum-mechanical treatments—including equilibrium and nonequilibrium ab initio molecular dynamics (AIMD)—are strictly limited to small length and time scales. Consequently, alternative frameworks utilizing simplifying assumptions are required to capture larger-scale kinetics. In classical (Newtonian) MD, the trajectories of atoms or molecules (particles) are governed by the empirical or effective interaction potentials. These potentials are traditionally parameterized by fitting to ab initio calculations or experimental thermophysical properties, or they are trained using machine learning frameworks. From the ensembles of simulated particles, static or dynamic thermal properties or scattering rates are derived. At yet larger length scales (mesoscale, involving many mean free paths), the Boltzmann transport equation (BTE) which is based on the classical Hamiltonian-statistical mechanics is applied. BTE considers particle states in terms of position and momentum vectors (x,p) and this is represented as the state occupation probability. The occupation has equilibrium distributions (the known boson, fermion, and Maxwell–Boltzmann particles) and transport of energy (heat) is due to nonequilibrium (cause by a driving force or potential). Central to the transport is the role of scattering which turns the distribution toward equilibrium. The scattering is presented by the relations time or the mean free path. The relaxation time (or its inverse which is the interaction rate) is found from other calculations (ab initio or MD) or empirically. BTE can be numerically solved with Monte Carlo method, etc.

The appropriate modeling framework (ab initio, MD, or BTE) is selected based on the target length and time scales of the system. Heat transfer physics analyses can couple these frameworks—for example, by feeding scattering rates calculated from ab initio or classical MD directly into the BTE—to systematically evaluate the states and kinetics governing thermal energy storage, transport, and transformation. Ultimately, heat transfer physics bridges classical and quantum mechanical perspectives to characterize the kinetics of the four principal energy carriers. This foundation enables robust multiscale workflows (from ab initio to MD, BTE, and macroscale) capable of capturing low-dimensionality and size effects.

== Storage (Heat Capacity) ==
From a fundamental perspective, thermal energy is stored within principal energy carriers, such as phonons, electrons, fluid particles, and photons. Consequently, the stored thermal energy is determined by the energy levels and population distributions of these carriers. The population at a specific energy level is given by the product of the density of states [the number of available quantum or classical states at a given energy level, D(E)] and the occupancy function [the probability that a state is occupied, f(E,T)]. Depending on the nature of the carrier, this distribution typically follows Bose-Einstein statistics (for phonons and photons), Fermi-Dirac statistics (for electrons), or Maxwell-Boltzmann statistics (for classical particles). The energy storage (sensible heat) associated with each carrier is quantified by the specific heat capacity at either constant volume or constant pressure (c_{v} or c_{p}). Characterizing these heat capacities requires identifying the energy distribution among the principal carriers.

=== Phonon ===
The phonon dispersion relation describes all possible phonon modes within the Brillouin zone (the primitive cell in reciprocal space) and provides the phonon density of states, D_{p}. Because phonons are bosonic particles, their occupancy follows the Bose–Einstein distribution {f_{p}^{o} = [exp(ħω_{p}/k_{B}T)-1]^{−1}, k_{B}: Boltzmann constant}. Using the phonon density of states and this occupancy distribution, the phonon energy can be expressed as E_{p}(T) = ∫D_{p}(ω_{p})f_{p}(ω_{p},T)ħω_{p}dω_{p}, and the phonon number density is given by n_{p}(T) = ∫D_{p}(ω_{p})f_{p}(ω_{p},T)dω_{p}. The phonon specific heat capacity is then derived from the temperature sensitivity of the internal energy distribution:
$$c_{v,p}  =  \int \hbar\omega_p\, D_p(\omega_p)\, \frac{\partial f_p(\omega_p,T)}{\partial T}\, d\omega_p.$$

=== Electron ===
The energy states of electrons in a solid are determined by the time-independent Schrödinger equation, in which the Hamiltonian accounts for the potential energy within the lattice. Solving the eigenvalue equation [H_{e}ψ_{e,κ} = E_{e}(κ_{e})ψ_{e,κ}] yields the electron wave function, ψ_{e, κ}, and the corresponding eigenvalues, E_{e}(κ_{e}) which defines the electronic band structure as a function of the wavevector κ_{e}. In practical applications, the complex many-body interactions among electrons and nuclei are often simplified using density functional theory (DFT). By employing functionals of the spatially dependent electron density, DFT-based ab initio software packages, such as VASP, Quantum ESPRESSO, and WIEN2k, enable accurate calculations of these electronic energy states. The contribution of electrons to the specific heat capacity is governed by the distribution and occupancy of these energy states, which follow Fermi-Dirac statistics. In general, the electronic contribution to heat capacity is small, except at very high temperatures where electrons are in thermal equilibrium with phonons (the lattice).

=== Fluid particle ===
The energy states of fluid particles are determined using their respective quantum Hamiltonians (translational: H_{f,t} = −(ħ^{2}/2m)∇^{2}, vibrational: H_{f,v} = −(ħ^{2}/2m)∇^{2} + Γx^{2}/2, and rotational: H_{f,r} = −(ħ^{2}/2I_{f})∇^{2}, where Γ is the spring constant and I_{f} is the molecular moment of inertia). Thermodynamic properties of fluid particles, including heat capacity, are analyzed using statistical mechanics. The partition function serves as a bridge between the microscopic energy states obtained from the Hamiltonians and the macroscopic thermodynamic properties. With the degeneracy g_{f,i} at the quantized energy level i having energy E_{f,i}, the total energy and partition function of the fluid are expressed as E_{f} = Σ_{i}E_{f,i}, and $Z_f = \sum_{i=0}^{\infty} g_{f,i}\exp\left(-\frac{E_{f,i}}{k_B T}\right)$, respectively. For multiple energy modes, the total fluid energy and partition function become $E_f = \sum_{i} E_{f,i} = E_{f,t} + E_{f,v} + E_{f,r} + \cdots$, and $Z_f = \prod_{i} Z_{f,i} = Z_{f,t} Z_{f,v} Z_{f,r} \cdots$. For continuous energy levels, the partition function is generally expressed as
$$Z(T,V,N) = \frac{1}{N!h^{3N}} \iint e^{-\beta H(p,q)} \, dp \, dq,$$
where H(p,q) is the Hamiltonian with momentum p and position q, and $\beta$ = 1/k_{B}T. The average specific internal energy at equilibrium is then calculated from the partition function as
$$e_f = \frac{U}{m} = -\frac{1}{m}\frac{\partial}{\partial \beta}\ln Z = \frac{k_B T^2}{m} \left(\frac{\partial \ln Z_f}{\partial T}\right)_{N,V}$$
. The specific heat capacity at constant volume is given by
$$c_{v,f} = k_B \beta^2\left(\frac{\partial^2}{\partial \beta^2}\ln Z\right).$$

=== Photon ===
Photons within an enclosure are modeled as a photon gas, which behaves as a collection of massless bosons with zero chemical potential. Because the number of photons is not conserved, the occupancy of energy states is governed by the Bose–Einstein distribution, f_{ph} = [exp(ħω_{ph}/k_{B}T)-1]^{-1}. The photon density of states in a three-dimensional cavity is expressed as $D_{ph}(\omega) = \frac{\omega^2}{\pi^2 u_{ph}^3}$, where u_{ph} is the speed of photon. The total thermal energy stored in the photon gas is calculated as $E_{ph}(T) = \int_0^\infty D_{ph}(\omega)f_{ph}(\omega,T)\hbar \omega\, d\omega$, and then, the specific heat capacity, $c_{v,ph} = \frac{\partial E_{ph}}{\partial T} = \frac{8 \pi^5 k_B^4}{15 u_{ph}^3 h^3}T^3$, is derived from this temperature-dependent energy, yielding the characteristic $T^3$ dependence associated with the Stefan-Boltzmann law.

== Transport ==
Transport properties in bulk materials are characterized by the thermal conductivity tensor K (W/m·K), defined through Fourier’s law, $\mathbf{q}_k = -\mathbf{K} \cdot \nabla T$ ($\mathbf{q}_k$: heat flux and $\nabla T$: temperature gradient) In contrast, heat transport across interfaces or confined regions smaller than the carrier mean free path (the average distance traveled by a carrier between scattering events) is characterized by the areal thermal conductance, G (W/m^{2}·K), or the areal thermal resistance, R (m^{2}·K/W), such that $q_k = G \Delta T = \frac{\Delta T}{R}$. The heat flux is regarded as the net flux of the principal energy carriers and can be calculated from the nonequilibrium occupancy of the principal carriers ($f'$) as $\mathbf{q}_k = \sum_{\alpha} \frac{1}{C\pi^3}\int E(\mathbf{\kappa})\mathbf{u(\mathbf{\kappa})} f'(\mathbf{\kappa}) d\kappa$, where C is eight for phonons and four for electrons, $\alpha$, $\kappa$, E, and $\mathbf{u}$ denote the mode, wavevector, energy, and velocity of the thermal energy carriers, respectively. Here, the out of equilibrium, $f'$ can be obtained by solving the Boltzmann transport equation (numerically using the Monte Carlo method).

According to the kinetic theory of gases, the thermal conductivity of the principal carrier i (p, e, f, or ph) is expressed as
$$k_i = \frac{1}{3} n_i c_{v,i} u_i \lambda_i,$$
where n_{i} is the carrier density, c_{v,i} is the heat capacity per carrier, u_{i} is the carrier velocity, and λ_{i} is the mean free path, defined as the average distance traveled by a carrier between scattering events. Consequently, higher carrier density, larger heat capacity, higher carrier velocity, and reduced scattering (longer mean free path) lead to greater thermal conductivity. n_{i} and c_{v,i} are obtained directly from the energy spectra and occupancy functions. The carrier velocity, u_{i} depends on the physics of the carrier: for wave-like carriers (phonons, electrons, and photons), it is the group velocity calculated from the dispersion relation u_{i}= ∂ω /∂κ, whereas for fluid particles, it corresponds to the average thermal velocity. To accurately determine the mean free path λ_{i}, one must analyze the kinetics of the various scattering mechanisms unique to the type and properties of each carrier.

Characterizing heat transfer across a spatial boundary or material interface requires analysis of carrier transmission and scattering at the interface rather than consideration of bulk mean free paths. Under a small temperature bias, the interfacial thermal conductance (G_{b} = 1/R_{b}) is given by
$$G_b = \frac{1}{R_b} = \frac{1}{4} \sum_j \int_0^{\omega_{\max}} D_{1,j}(\omega) u_{1,j}(\omega) \hbar \omega \frac{\partial f(\omega,T)}{\partial T} \alpha_{1 \rightarrow 2}(\omega)\, d\omega,$$
where D_{1, j}(ω) is the density of states for carrier mode j on side 1 of the interface, u_{1, j}(ω) is the carrier group velocity, f(ω,T) is the equilibrium carrier occupancy distribution function, and α_{1→2}(ω) is the transmission probability for carriers crossing from side 1 to side 2.

When a physical region is narrower than the carrier mean free path (< λ_{i}), carriers traverse the region without undergoing internal scattering. This regime is referred to as ballistic transport. In this case, heat flow is described by the Landauer formalism, and the ballistic thermal conductance G is expressed as
$$G = \frac{1}{2\pi} \int_0^{\infty} D_k(\omega) \hbar \omega \frac{\partial f(\omega,T)}{\partial T} \mathcal{T}(\omega) \, d\omega,$$
where D_{k}(ω) denotes the number of active conducting channels (modes) at frequency ω, and $\mathcal{T}(\omega)$ is the net transmission probability of carriers traversing the ballistic channel.

=== Phonon ===
In dielectric solids and semiconductors, acoustic and optical phonons serve as the primary carriers of thermal energy. The carrier velocity, u_{p}= ∂ω _{p}/∂κ_{p}, is the group velocity derived directly from the phonon dispersion relation within the Brillouin zone. The effective phonon mean free path, λ_{p}, is governed by Matthiessen rule, which accounts for the combined effects of intrinsic phonon-phonon (p-p) scattering (Normal and Umklapp processes), extrinsic defect and impurity scattering, and boundary scattering. When the characteristic dimensions of a system approach or fall below λ_{p}, boundary scattering becomes dominant, leading to a significant reduction in the effective thermal conductivity. For interfacial transport, the transmission probability, α_{1→2}(ω), is commonly described by the Acoustic Mismatch Model (AMM) for atomically smooth, specular interfaces and by the Diffuse Mismatch Model (DMM) for rough interfaces where diffuse scattering dominates.

=== Electron ===
In metals and highly doped semiconductors, electrical and thermal transport are strongly coupled, with free electrons serving as the dominant heat carriers. Because electrons are fermions, only those near the Fermi energy contribute significantly to transport. Consequently, the carrier velocity is well approximated by the Fermi velocity, u_{e} ≈ u_{F} = ħκ_{F}/m_{e,e}, where κ_{F} is the Fermi wavevector and m_{e,e} is the effective electron mass. The electron mean free path, λ_{e}, is governed mainly by electron-phonon (e-p) scattering at room temperature and by electron-defect scattering at cryogenic temperatures. Across metal/metal interfaces, thermal conductance is typically high because of efficient electronic-state coupling across the interface. In contrast, at metal/dielectric interfaces, the mismatch between electronic states in the metal and vibrational modes in the dielectric introduces substantial interfacial thermal resistance (R_{b}). As a result, thermal energy needs to be transferred through localized e-p coupling processes near the interface.

=== Fluid Particle ===
In fluid systems (gases and liquids), thermal transport occurs through the translational motion and collisions of molecules or atoms. Unlike wave-based energy carriers, the fluid-particle velocity, u_{f} = (8k_{B}T/πm)^{1/2}, corresponds to the mean thermal speed derived from the classical Maxwell-Boltzmann distribution. The mean free path, λ_{f}, represents the average distance traveled between intermolecular collisions and is determined primarily by the fluid density and collision cross-section, λ _{f} = (2^{1/2}π d^{2}n_{f})^{-1}, where d is the molecular diameter and n_{f} is the molecular number density. In confined nanochannels, when the Knudsen number, Kn = λ_{f}/L, becomes large, gas transport enters the ballistic regime, in which molecule-wall collisions dominate over intermolecular collisions. Interfacial thermal conductance at fluid-solid boundaries is governed by the thermal accommodation coefficient, which quantifies the efficiency of momentum and energy exchange during fluid-wall collision events.

=== Photon ===
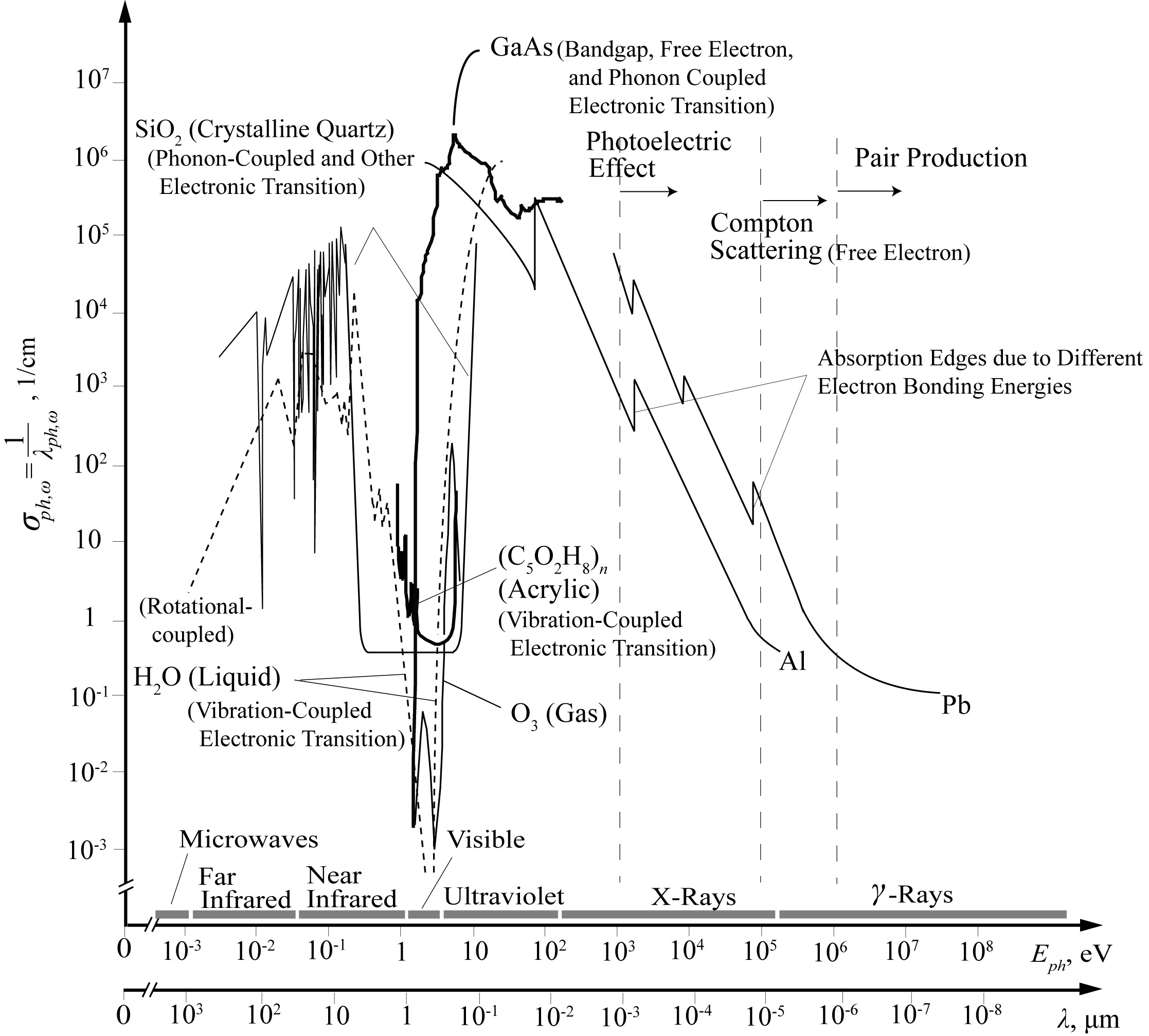
Spectral photon absorption coefficient for typical gas, liquid, and solid phases. For the solid phase, examples of polymer, oxide, semiconductor, and metals are given.

Thermal radiation can be modeled as a gas of photons propagating through a medium or vacuum. The photon velocity is given by u_{ph} = u_{ph,o}/n, where u_{ph,o} is the speed of light in vacuum and n is the refractive index of the medium. In participating media, the photon mean free path, λ_{ph}, is determined by the inverse of the extinction coefficient, which accounts for both absorption and scattering by particles, defects, or microstructural features. While far-field radiative heat transfer across large separations is bounded by the classical Stefan-Boltzmann law, nanoscale gaps smaller than the dominant thermal wavelength (approximately 10 μm at room temperature) give rise to near-field radiative effects. In this regime, evanescent-wave coupling and surface-polariton resonances can dramatically enhance the transmission probability, enabling the thermal conductance to exceed the far-field blackbody limit by several orders of magnitude.

== Energy conversion ==
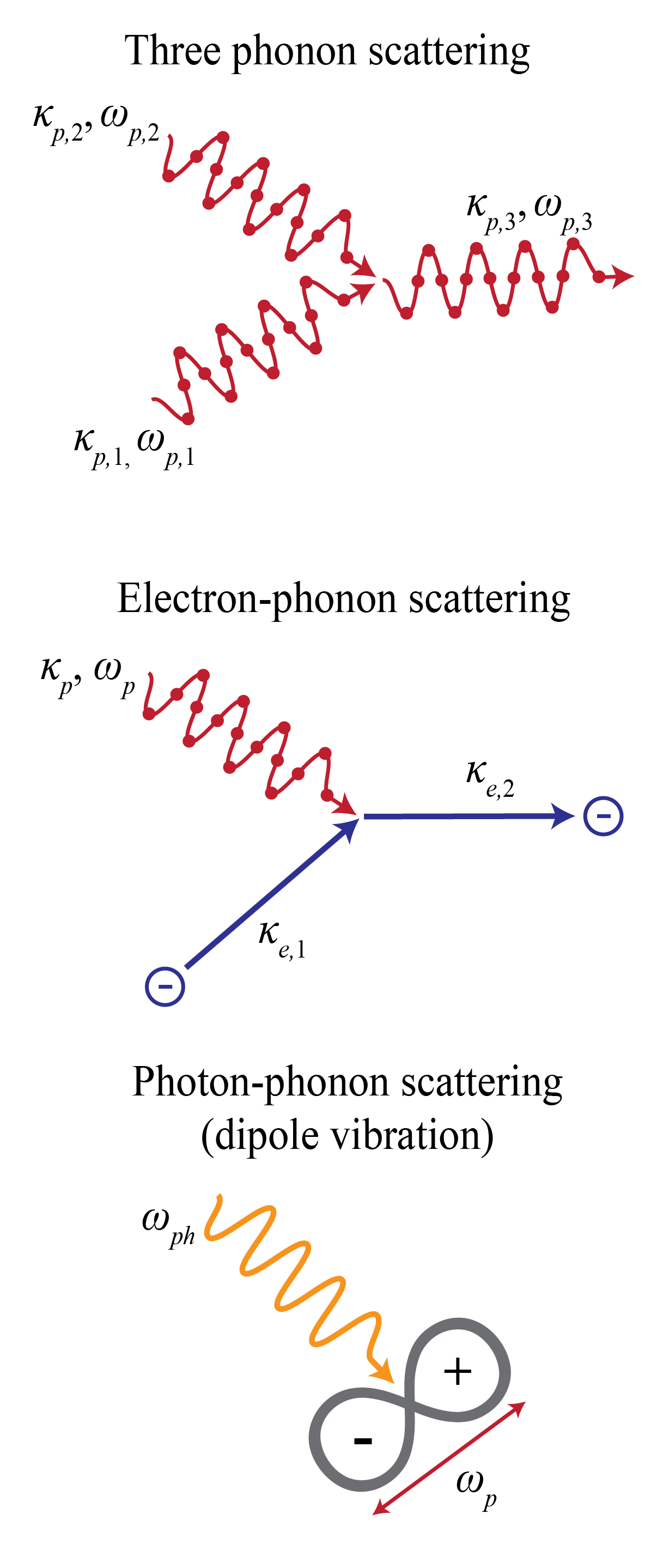
Schematic examples of carrier collisions (scattering), which lead to energy conversion.

Collisions among different energy carriers result in the exchange of momentum and, if inelastic, energy. For example, the photovoltaic effect is a result of electrons absorbing photons, converting photonic (light) energy to electronic energy. Instead, during Joule heating, excited electrons emit phonons leading to heating of the crystal lattice. The energy carriers may also scatter among themselves. This includes phonon-phonon scattering and electron-electron scattering in condensed matter.

These interactions allow a non-equilibrium system to relax toward equilibrium. For example, a strong non-equilibrium state in the phonon system of gallium arsenide (GaAs), commonly referred to as 'hot phonons', occurs as an overpopulation of longitudinal optical (LO) phonons. These hot phonons are generated when energetic charge carriers transfer excess kinetic energy to the lattice much faster than it can thermalize, and they subsequently relax through electron–phonon interactions, converting phononic energy back into electronic energy.

Change in Electron and Phonon Populations During Their Energy Exchange (Hot optical phonon absorption by conduction electron in GaAs)

During the collisions, the total energy and momentum must be conserved, i.e. $E'=E+\Delta E$ and $\boldsymbol{\kappa}'=\boldsymbol{\kappa}+\Delta \boldsymbol{\kappa}+\boldsymbol{g}$ for a collision, where $\boldsymbol{g}$ is the reciprocal lattice vector which is relevant in condensed matter. The initial and final states for the involved carrier are coupled quantum-mechanically. Using perturbation theory through Fermi's golden rule, the scattering rate (transition probability per unit time) can be predicted, which is given by $\dot{\gamma}_{i\text{-}j}=\frac{2\pi}{\hbar}|M_{i\text{-}j}|^2D_j(E+\Delta E)$, where $|M_{i\text{-}j}|$ is the matrix element coupling the initial quantum state $|i\rangle$ to a final quantum state $\langle j |$, and $D_j(E+ \Delta E)$ is the density of final states (at the final carrier energy).

== Applications ==
Heat transfer physics describes the atomic and quantum nature of heat, including energy storage, transport, and conversion. The tailoring of these aspects, particularly the spectral (phononic) features of thermal energy, is relevant to a variety of engineering and applied physics challenges. For example, in thermoelectricity, equilibrium thermal energy is transferred or harvested using electron transport and energy conversion. However, thermal energy in condensed matter exists within the spectral phonon distribution and occupancy, which can be in a nonequilibrium condition. These features have led to new, phonon-centered approaches for material synthesis and energy-efficient device physics, namely in semiconductor materials as described in more detail below.

=== Phonon harvesting in semiconductors ===
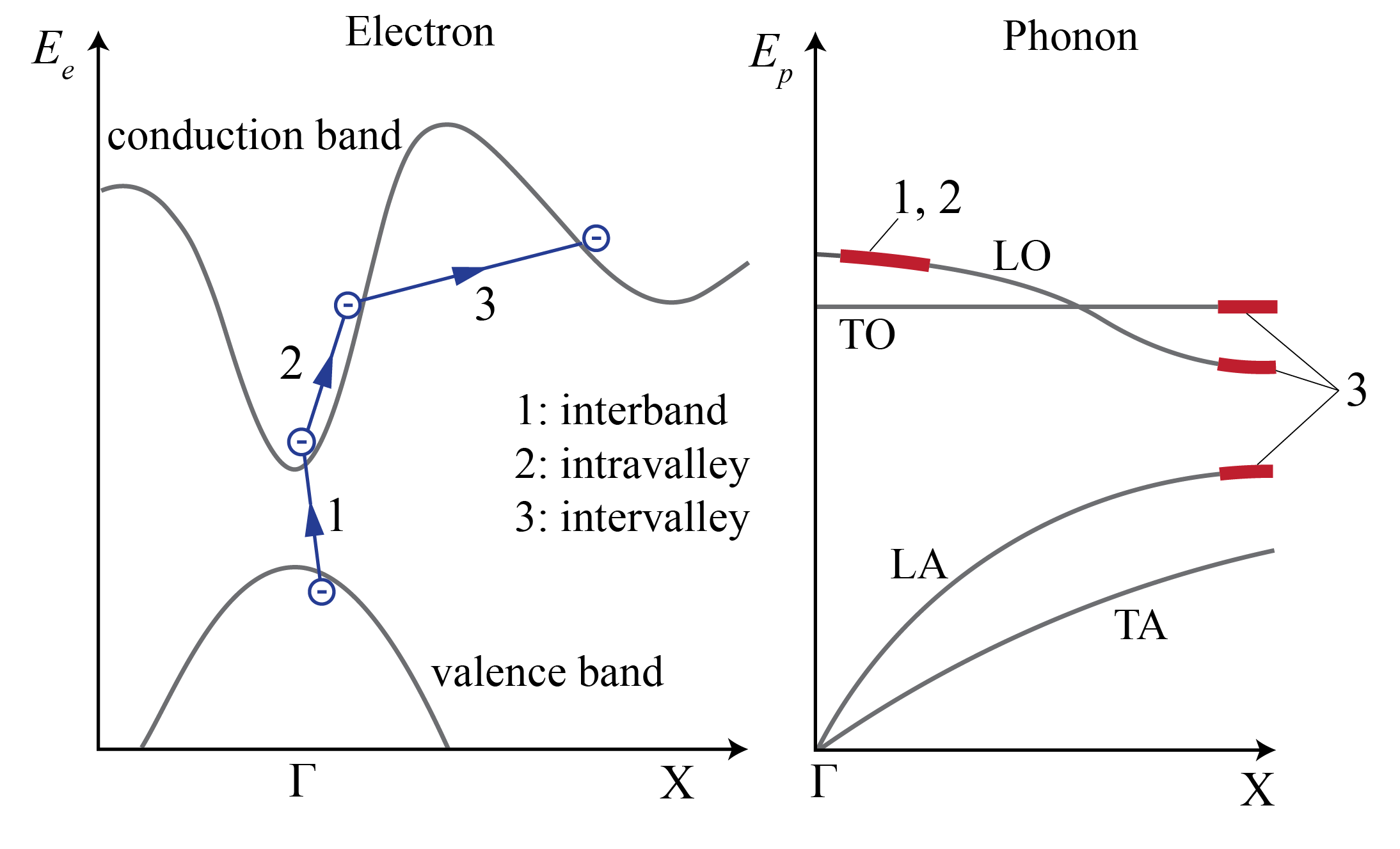
Electron and phonon band structures (dispersions) for a representative polar semiconductor. Different types of phonon absorption transitions involving electrons are shown along with the participating phonon phase space. As shown, energy and momentum conservation constrains the phonon modes participating in electron-phonon scattering. This feature leads to resonant, nonequilibrium features that can be exploited during energy conversion.

In semiconductor devices, inefficiencies during energy conversion or transport results in the generation of high-entropy thermal vibrations (phonons). For example, in semiconductor transistors, large electric fields in the channel accelerates electrons to high-energy electron states favorable for the emission of phonons. In high-field conditions, energetic phonons can accumulate, degrading electronic performance and leading to waste heat. As a result, there is an opportunity to harvest the phonons, particularly prior to their thermalization, for improved device energy efficiency. Since traditional bulk thermoelectrics are large and not well suited for monolithic device integration, the use of nanoscale phonon absorbing structures is preferred to leverage the local nonequilibrium.

Solid-state (semiconductor) thermionic potential barriers are an example of a nonequilibrium phonon-electron energy conversion system. These systems exploit electron kinetic energy filtering at a potential barrier created by semiconductor heterostructures, allowing for their on site integration into semiconductor device architectures. Specifically, when a thermal electron population encounters a potential barrier, transmission is limited to states with sufficient kinetic energy. The reflected population loses kinetic energy and this nonequilibrium with the lattice leads to net phonon absorption, locally extracting thermal energy. Exploiting these effects in semiconductor devices for phonon recycling has been studied, for example in diodes. Momentum and energy conservation constrains phonon absorption (and emission) scattering events by electron transitions in the band structure to specific phonon modes. These phonon-resonant characteristics, for example intervalley coupling or quantum confinement features, have been studied for enhanced solid-state phonon harvesting devices. In the phonovoltaic concept, Brillouin zone-center nonequilibrium optical phonons are absorbed for electron-hole pair generation.

== See also ==
- Energy transfer
- Mass transfer
- Energy transformation (Energy conversion)
- Thermal physics
- Thermal science
- Thermal engineering
- Phonovoltaic
