= Sabine Bögli =

Swiss mathematician

Sabine Bögli (also published as Boegli) is a Swiss mathematician specialising in mathematical analysis, including the spectral theory of non-self-adjoint Schrödinger operators and their applications in mathematical physics. Her research has resolved a decades-old dispute over the location of autoionizing resonances in atoms and molecules, answered a longstanding open question on the accumulation of eigenvalues of Schrödinger operators, and disproved a conjecture of Laptev and Safronov relating the magnitude of these eigenvalues to the norm of the potential. She works in England as an associate professor at Durham University.

== Education and career ==
Bögli is Swiss, and speaks Swiss German natively. After secondary education at the Gymnasium Biel-Seeland in Biel/Bienne, she studied mathematics at the University of Bern, receiving a bachelor's degree in 2010, a master's degree in 2012, and a Ph.D. in 2014. Her doctoral dissertation, Spectral approximation for linear operators and applications, was supervised by Christiane Tretter.

After postdoctoral research at the University of Bern, Cardiff University, Imperial College London, and LMU Munich, and a Chapman Fellowship at Imperial College London, she joined Durham University as an assistant professor in 2019. She was promoted to associate professor in 2023.

== Recognition ==
Bögli was a 2024 recipient of the Whitehead Prize of the London Mathematical Society, given for her research on Schrödinger operators.
