= Internal flow =

Fluid flow within a fully confined region

In fluid mechanics, internal flow is a flow wherein the fluid is completely confined by inner surfaces of an item (e.g. a tube). Hence the boundary layer is unable to develop without eventually being constrained. The internal flow configuration represents a convenient geometry for heating and cooling fluids used in chemical processing, environmental control, and energy conversion technologies. Internal flow is fully dominated by viscosity throughout the flow field.

An example includes flow in a pipe.
