= Irving Levitas =

Soviet-born American Jewish scholar and lecturer (1900–1977)

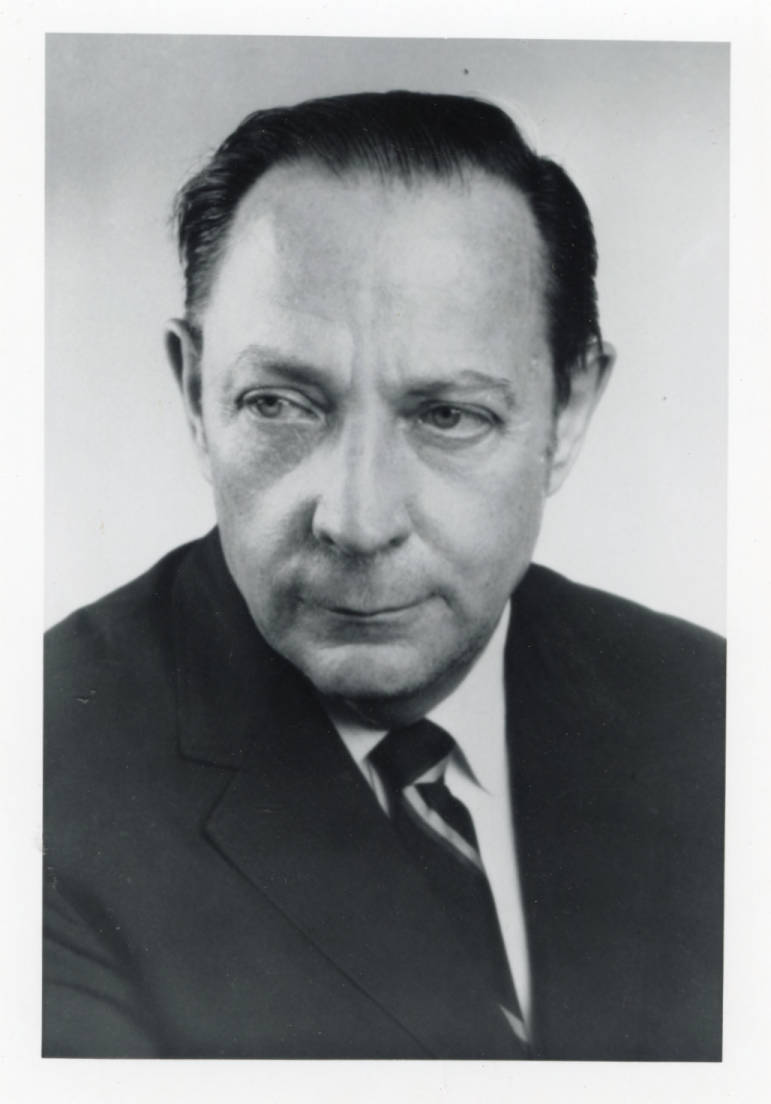
- Levitas, c. 1960s
- Born: August 27, 1910; Kyiv, Russian Empire
- Died: November 24, 1987 (aged 77); Hawthorne, New York, US

Academic background
- Education: University of Chicago; New York University

Academic work
- Discipline: Theology
- Sub-discipline: Jewish studies

Irving Levitas (August 27, 1910 – November 24, 1987) was a Ukrainian-born American Jewish scholar, lecturer and Talmudist.

Levitas was born on August 27, 1910 near Kyiv, in the Russian Empire. In 1914, he moved to Chicago and later graduated from the University of Chicago, with a master's degree in history. He moved to Kansas City, Missouri and worked as an educational director for both The Temple, Congregation B'nai Jehudah and the Jewish Community Center of Kansas City. He also lectured on Semitic studies from 1948 to 1962, at the University of Kansas. On May 8, 1960, he served as assistant to rabbi Samuel S. Mayerberg during the 77th birthday party of former President Harry S. Truman, at the Muehlebach Hotel.

He moved to New York City in 1962, living in an apartment with copious amounts of books on Jewish history. He graduated from New York University with a doctorate. A Reform Jew, he was ordained a rabbi after endorsement from three other rabbis. From 1975 until his death, he was a scholar for Temple Emmanuel, in Yonkers, as well as being a lecturer for SUNY Sullivan. He died on November 24, 1987, aged 77, of lung cancer, in a nursing home in Hawthorne. In the late 1980s, collector Michael Zinman purchased his collection.
