= Valery I. Levitas =

Valery I Levitas
- Born: Ukraine
- Occupations: Mechanics and material scientist, academic and author

Academic background
- Education: M.S., Mechanical Engineering; PHD, Materials Science and Engineering; D.Sc., Continuum Mechanics; Habilitation in Continuum Mechanics
- Alma mater: Kiev Polytechnic Institute; Institute for Superhard Materials
- Thesis: Simulation of Materials Plastic Flow at High Pressure (1981); Large Elastoplastic Deformation of Materials at High Pressure (1988)

Academic work
- Institutions: Iowa State University

Valery I Levitas is a Ukrainian mechanics and material scientist, academic and author. He is an Anson Marston Distinguished Professor and Murray Harpole Chair in Engineering at Iowa State University and was a faculty scientist at the Ames National Laboratory.

Levitas is most known for his works on the mechanics of materials, stress and strain-induced phase transformations and chemical reactions. Among his authored works are his publications in academic journals, including Science, Nature Communications, Nano Letters as well as monographs such as Large Deformation of Materials with Complex Rheological Properties at Normal and High Pressure. He is the recipient of the 2018 Khan International Award for outstanding contributions to the field of plasticity.

== Education ==
Levitas earned his M.S. in Mechanical Engineering from Kiev Polytechnic Institute in 1978, followed by a PHD in Materials Science and Engineering from the Institute for Superhard Materials in 1981. In 1988, he completed a Doctor of Science degree in Continuum Mechanics from the Institute of Electronic Machine Building. Furthermore, in 1995, he obtained his Doctor-Engineer habilitation in Continuum Mechanics from the University of Hannover.

== Career ==
Levitas commenced his academic journey in 1978 at the Institute for Superhard Materials of the Ukrainian Academy of Sciences in Kiev. From 1978 to 1981, he served as an engineer and then as a junior researcher from 1981 to 1984. During his tenure at the institute, he led a research group consisting of researchers and students from 1982 to 1994. Simultaneously, he held the positions of senior researcher from 1984 to 1988 and leading researcher from 1989 to 1994. Additionally, he founded the private research firm, Strength, in 1988. Since 1993 he was a Humboldt Research Fellow at the Institute of Structural and Computational Mechanics at the University of Hannover, serving until 1995. From 1995 to 1999, he continued at the same institution as a research and visiting professor. In 1999, he transitioned to Texas Tech University, where he was an associate professor in the Department of Mechanical Engineering until 2002, and then a professor until 2008. He was also the Founding Director of the Center for Mechanochemistry and Synthesis of New Materials from 2002 till 2007. From 2008 to 2017, he served as the Schafer 2050 Challenge Professor in both the Department of Aerospace Engineering and the Department of Mechanical Engineering at Iowa State University. Between 2017 and 2023, he was the Vance Coffman Faculty Chair Professor in Aerospace Engineering, and since 2023 the Murray Harpole Chair in Engineering. Moreover, he has been the Anson Marston Distinguished Professor in Engineering since 2018, all at the same Departments. In addition, he has served as a faculty scientist at the Ames National Laboratory within the US Department of Energy from 2008 to 2023.

Since 2002 he has also run the research and consulting firm Material Modeling.

== Research ==
Levitas' research has focused on the interplay between plasticity and phase transformations across various scales through the creation of various methodologies. He pioneered the field of theoretical high-pressure mechanochemistry through the development of a comprehensive four-scale theory and simulations spanning from the first principle and molecular dynamics to nano- and microscale phase-field approaches and macroscale treatment. His work includes coupling theoretical frameworks with quantitative in-situ experiments using synchrotron radiation facilities to investigate phase transformations and plastic flow in various materials under high pressure and large deformations. These efforts resulted in the identification of novel phenomena and phases, methods for controlling phase transformations, and the search for new high-pressure materials. Additionally, his research has contributed to the determination of material properties such as transformational, structural, deformational, and frictional characteristics from high throughput heterogeneous sample fields. His research team discovered and harnessed the phenomenon of "rotational plastic instability" to lower the required pressure for producing superhard cubic BN, reducing it from 55 to 5.6GPa. In addition, their theoretical insights enabled a reduction in the transformation pressure from graphite to diamond, dropping it from 70 to 0.7GPa through shear-induced plasticity. Moreover, his team unveiled a new amorphous phase of SiC, the self-blow-up phase transformation-induced plasticity-heating process explaining deep-focus earthquakes, the pressure self-focusing effect, virtual melting at temperatures up to 5000K below melting point as a novel mechanism of solid phase transformation, stress relaxation, and plastic flow. Furthermore, his group introduced a mechanochemical melt dispersion mechanism to explain unusual phenomena in the combustion of Al particles at nano and micro scales, proposing significant advancements in particle synthesis, including the creation of prestressed particles, to enhance their energetic performance. He also advanced phase field approach to various phase transformations, dislocation evolution, fracture, surface-induced phenomena, and their interaction by introducing advanced mechanics, large-strain formulation, strict requirements, and extending to larger sample scale.

=== Patents ===
Levitas holds patents to 11 different inventions. They are mostly related to the development of high-pressure apparatuses for diamond synthesis and physical studies. They include a rotational diamond anvil cell.

== Awards and honors ==
- 1995 – Distinguished Paper Award, International Journal of Engineering Sciences
- 1998 – Richard von Mises Award, GAMM
- 2007 – ASME Fellow, American Society of Mechanical Engineers
- 2010 – Lifetime Achievement Award, International Biographical Centre
- 2011 – Honorary Doctor in Materials, Institute for Superhard Materials
- 2018 – Khan International Award
- 2023 – Member, EU Academy of Sciences
- 2023 – Member, European Academy of Sciences and Arts
- 2023 – IAAM Fellow, International Association of Advanced Materials

== Bibliography ==
=== Books ===
- Large Deformation of Materials with Complex Rheological Properties at Normal and High Pressure (1996) ISBN 1560720859

=== Selected articles ===
- Levitas, V. I. (1998). Thermomechanical theory of martensitic phase transformations in inelastic materials. International Journal of Solids and Structures, 35(9–10), 889–940.
- Mielke, A., Theil, F., & Levitas, V. I. (2002). A Variational Formulation of Rate-Independent Phase Transformations Using an Extremum Principle. Archive for Rational Mechanics and Analysis, 162, 137–177.
- Levitas, V. I., & Preston, D. L. (2002). Three-dimensional Landau theory for multivariant stress-induced martensitic phase transformations. I. Austenite↔ martensite. Physical Review B, 66(13), 134206.
- Levitas, V. I., Asay, B. W., Son, S. F., & Pantoya, M. (2006). Melt dispersion mechanism for fast reaction of nanothermites. Applied Physics Letters, 89(7) 071909.
- Hsieh S., Bhattacharyya P., Zu C., Mittiga T., Smart T. J., Machado F., Kobrin B., Höhn T. O., Rui N. Z., Kamrani M., Chatterjee S., Choi S., Zaletel M., Struzhkin V. V., Moore J. E., Levitas V. I., Jeanloz R., Yao N. Y. (2019) Imaging stress and magnetism at high pressures using a nanoscale quantum sensor. Science, 366, 1349–1354.
- Levitas V.I. and Samani K. (2011) Size and mechanics effects in surface-induced melting of nanoparticles. Nature Communications, 2, 284.
