= Journal of Applied Mathematics and Mechanics =

Monthly academic journal

- Discipline: Mathematics
- Language: English
- Edited by: Holm Altenbach

Publication details
- History: 1921–present
- Publisher: Wiley-VCH for the Gesellschaft für Angewandte Mathematik und Mechanik (Germany)
- Frequency: Monthly
- Open access: Hybrid
- Impact factor: 2.3 (2022)

Standard abbreviations
- ISO 4: J. Appl. Math. Mech.

Indexing
- CODEN: ZAMMAX
- ISSN: 0044-2267 (print); 1521-4001 (web)
- LCCN: 31029347
- OCLC no.: 01590219

Links
- Journal homepage; Journal at Wiley Online Library

The Journal of Applied Mathematics and Mechanics, also known as Zeitschrift für Angewandte Mathematik und Mechanik or ZAMM, is a monthly peer-reviewed scientific journal dedicated to applied mathematics. It is published by Wiley-VCH on behalf of the Gesellschaft für Angewandte Mathematik und Mechanik. The editor-in-chief is Holm Altenbach (Otto von Guericke University Magdeburg). According to the Journal Citation Reports, the journal has a 2022 impact factor of 2.3.

== Publication history ==
The journal's first issue appeared in 1921, published by the Verein Deutscher Ingenieure and edited by Richard von Mises.
