= Gesellschaft für Angewandte Mathematik und Mechanik =

German scientific society

Gesellschaft für angewandte Mathematik und Mechanik
- Formation: 1922
- Founder: Ludwig Prandtl; Richard von Mises
- Location: Dresden, Germany
- Members: 2,500
- President: Karsten Urban
- Website: http://www.gamm-ev.de

Gesellschaft für Angewandte Mathematik und Mechanik (GAMM; 'Society of Applied Mathematics and Mechanics') is a German society for the promotion of science, founded in 1922 by the physicist Ludwig Prandtl and the mathematician Richard von Mises. The society awards the Richard von Mises prize annually. The society publishes the journal GAMM-Mitteilungen (Surveys for Applied Mathematics and Mechanics) and Zeitschrift für Angewandte Mathematik und Mechanik (Journal of Applied Mathematics and Mechanics) through Wiley.

According to the statutes, GAMM aims "to maintain and promote scientific work and international cooperation in applied mathematics as well as in all sub-areas of mechanics and physics that are part of the fundamentals the engineerings count." The GAMM pursues this goal primarily by organizing scientific conferences. The GAMM's most important event is the annual conference, which takes place annually in Germany or neighboring countries and is attended by hundreds of scientists, primarily because of its scientific program. The proceedings volume (PAMM) is published every year at the conference. In addition, further conferences on specific areas from the spectrum of disciplines represented in the GAMM take place.

In 1958 the GAMM and the ACM together worked out the "ALGOL 58 Report" at a meeting in Zurich.

== Executive board members ==
Presidents and vice-presidents of the society since inception:

Period	President	Vice-president
1922-1923	Ludwig Prandtl	—
1923-1933	Ludwig Prandtl	Hans Reissner
1933-1937	Ludwig Prandtl	Erich Trefftz
1937-1945	Ludwig Prandtl	Richard Grammel
1950-1952	Richard Grammel	Alwin Walther
1952-1955	Alwin Walther	Eberhard Mettler
1955-1958	Henry Görtler	Friedrich Adolf Willers
1958-1959	Robert Sauer	Friedrich Adolf Willers
1959-1961	Robert Sauer	Herbert Heinrich
1961-1964	Eberhard Mettler	Herbert Heinrich
1964-1967	Lothar Collatz	Herbert Heinrich
1967-1968	Karl Wieghardt	Herbert Heinrich
1968-1970	Karl Wieghardt	Erich Bukovics
1970-1971	Eduard Stiefel	Erich Bukovics
1971-1974	Eduard Stiefel	Klaus Oswatitsch
1974-1977	Ernst Becker	Eduard Stiefel
1977-1980	Peter Henrici	Ernst Becker
1980-1983	Klaus Kirchgässner	Peter Henrici
1983-1986	Jürgen Zierep	Klaus Kirchgässner
1986-1989	Wolfgang Walter	Jürgen Zierep
1989-1993	Oskar Mahrenholtz	Wolfgang Walter
1993-1996	Reinhard Mennicken	Oskar Mahrenholtz
1996-1999	Franz Ziegler	Reinhard Mennicken
1999-2002	Götz Alefeld	Franz Ziegler
2002-2005	Friedrich Pfeiffer	Götz Alefeld
2005-2008	Rolf Jeltsch	Friedrich Pfeiffer
2008-2011	Peter Wriggers	Rolf Jeltsch
2011-2014	Volker Mehrmann	Peter Wriggers
2014-2017	Wolfgang Ehlers	Volker Mehrmann
2017-2020	Heike Fassbender	Wolfgang Ehlers
2020-2023	Jörg Schröder	Heike Fassbender
2023-now	Karsten Urban	Jörg Schröder
