= Essentially non-oscillatory scheme =

Class of high-resolution schemes in numerical solutions of differential equations

A smooth wave steepening into a shock under Burgers' equation. A fixed third-order stencil (orange) oscillates at the shock, while third-order ENO (blue) captures it without oscillations. The exact solution is in black.

In numerical analysis, essentially non-oscillatory (ENO) schemes are a family of high-resolution methods, in principle of any order of accuracy, for solving hyperbolic conservation laws and related equations. Solutions of these equations can contain shock waves and other discontinuities, and a high-order approximation built across a discontinuity develops spurious oscillations. An ENO scheme avoids this by reconstructing the solution in each grid cell from the averages over a stencil of nearby cells, chosen from the data. Divided differences show where the solution looks smoothest, and the stencil grows in that direction, one cell at a time.

The resulting solution is formally high-order accurate in smooth regions, including at the smooth maxima and minima where total variation diminishing (TVD) schemes fall to first order, and it keeps transitions at discontinuities sharp. As the word "essentially" indicates, oscillations on the scale of a jump are ruled out, but small oscillations at the level of the truncation error can remain.

The reconstruction is turned into a scheme in one of two forms. The original finite-volume form evolves the cell averages, with a numerical flux at each cell face computed from the values reconstructed on either side of it. The later finite-difference form applies the same reconstruction to the flux itself and evolves point values. Above second order it needs a uniform or smoothly varying grid, but in several spatial dimensions it works one dimension at a time and needs several times fewer operations. For systems such as the Euler equations of gas dynamics, reconstructing in local characteristic variables is more robust than treating each component separately, though more expensive.

ENO schemes were developed in the mid-1980s by Ami Harten, Björn Engquist, Stanley Osher, and Sukumar Chakravarthy, who published their general construction in 1987. The finite-difference form followed in 1988, with Runge–Kutta time stepping designed to add no oscillations of its own. ENO schemes are more complicated and costly than typical flux-limited methods, and high-order ENO shows its advantage best where strong shocks and complicated smooth structure occur together, as in the interaction of shocks with turbulence. ENO also became the starting point for weighted ENO (WENO) schemes, which combine all the candidate stencils instead of choosing one, and which have since overtaken ENO in both method development and use.

== Background ==
=== Conservation laws and discontinuities ===
A conservation law says that the amount of a quantity in any interval changes only through its flux, the rate at which the quantity flows across the interval's ends. For a single quantity in one spatial dimension, it takes the form
$$\frac{\partial u}{\partial t} + \frac{\partial f(u)}{\partial x} = 0,$$
where $u(x,t)$ is the conserved quantity and $f(u)$ is its flux. With $f(u) = u$ this is the advection equation, in which the initial profile moves to the right with speed 1, and with $f(u) = u^2/2$ it is the inviscid Burgers' equation. The Euler equations of gas dynamics are a system of hyperbolic conservation laws. In Burgers' equation, each value of $u$ travels at speed $u$, so where the profile decreases, faster values behind catch up with slower ones ahead. The profile steepens until its slope becomes infinite, and the wave breaks into a shock. A numerical method therefore has to represent functions that are smooth except at isolated points, known as piecewise smooth functions.

=== Accuracy against oscillation ===
For scalar conservation laws, monotone schemes, such as the Lax–Friedrichs and first-order upwind schemes, can be proved to converge to the physically correct solution without oscillations. However, they are at most first-order accurate, so they converge slowly, and reaching a given accuracy may take a very fine grid and be computationally prohibitive. Traditional higher-order schemes have the opposite problem. Near a discontinuity they oscillate (the Gibbs phenomenon) and the oscillations do not shrink as the grid is refined. They can spread into smooth regions and can make a nonlinear calculation unstable. Godunov's theorem states that linear schemes cannot escape this trade-off: a scheme that is linear when applied to advection must be either oscillatory or only first-order accurate. A non-oscillatory scheme of higher order has to be nonlinear, with coefficients that depend on the solution, even for a linear equation.

Before ENO there were two main responses. One was to add artificial viscosity, but then its strength has to be tuned to the problem. The other was to apply flux limiters, which reduce the order of the approximation near a discontinuity. Limiters led to total variation diminishing (TVD) schemes, in which the total variation of the discrete solution,
$$\mathrm{TV}(u) = \sum_j |u_{j+1} - u_j|,$$
cannot grow from one time step to the next. TVD schemes give sharp, monotone discontinuities, but all of them fall to first-order accuracy near smooth extrema, which limits their global $L^1$ accuracy to second order at best.

=== The ENO idea ===
ENO rests on two observations. The first is that a wider stencil gives higher accuracy only if the function is smooth inside it. Near a shock, a fixed-stencil approximation is spoiled because its stencil contains the discontinuity, so a cell there should take its information from the smooth side, with the stencil chosen from the data.

The second observation is that the TVD condition is stricter than necessary. ENO aims instead for a condition of the form
$$\mathrm{TV}(u^{n+1}) \le \mathrm{TV}(u^n) + O(\Delta x^{q+1})$$
with $q > 0$, which lets the variation grow by a small amount that vanishes as the grid spacing $\Delta x$ goes to zero. A smooth maximum can then rise slightly from one step to the next, so nothing forces it to be clipped.

The adaptive ENO stencil involves no parameter that has to be tuned to the problem or the mesh. It also makes the scheme nonlinear even for linear equations, as Godunov's theorem requires of any non-oscillatory scheme of higher order.

== Reconstruction from cell averages ==
At the core of an ENO scheme is a procedure for approximating a function from discrete data. The differential equation enters only afterward.

=== The reconstruction problem ===
The domain of interest is divided into cells $I_i = [x_{i-1/2}, x_{i+1/2}]$ of width $\Delta x_i = x_{i+1/2} - x_{i-1/2}$. Integrating the one-dimensional scalar conservation law over one cell gives an exact equation for the cell average $\bar{u}_i$:
$$\frac{d\bar{u}_i}{dt} = -\frac{1}{\Delta x_i}\left[f\big(u(x_{i+1/2},t)\big) - f\big(u(x_{i-1/2},t)\big)\right],$$
where
$$\bar{u}_i(t) = \frac{1}{\Delta x_i}\int_{x_{i-1/2}}^{x_{i+1/2}} u(x,t)\,dx.$$

Reconstruction on a coarse grid. From the cell averages $\bar{u}_j$ (gray) of the unknown solution $u(x, t)$ (dashed), a quadratic $p_j(x)$ (blue) is built in each cell from the averages of the cell and its two neighbors. Each face receives two values, one from each side, such as $u^-_{i+1/2}$ and $u^+_{i+1/2}$.

A finite volume method evolves these averages, but the right-hand side needs values of $u(x, t)$ at the cell faces: $u(x_{i-1/2}, t)$ and $u(x_{i+1/2}, t)$.

Recovering them is the reconstruction problem. At a given time $t$, the only data are the averages $\bar{u}_j(t)$, and from them the aim is to build a polynomial $p_i(x)$ of degree at most $k-1$ in each cell that approximates the unknown solution,
$$p_i(x) = u(x, t) + O(\Delta x^k)$$
for all $x$ in the cell, wherever $u(x, t)$ is smooth, so that the method has order of accuracy $k$.

The averages enter through the way $p_i$ is built: it is required to have the given averages over a stencil of nearby cells, as described below. Since each cell has its own polynomial, every face receives two values, one from each side:
$$u^-_{i+1/2} = p_i(x_{i+1/2}),$$
$$u^+_{i+1/2} = p_{i+1}(x_{i+1/2}).$$

The reconstruction is repeated from the current averages every time the scheme evaluates its fluxes, and time plays no part in the reconstruction itself, which approximates a function of $x$ alone from its cell averages.

=== Reconstruction on a fixed stencil ===
A stencil for cell $I_i$ consists of that cell, $r$ cells to its left, and $s$ cells to its right, with $r, s \ge 0$ and $r+s+1=k$:
$$S(i) = \{I_{i-r}, \dots, I_i, \dots, I_{i+s}\}.$$
The stencil is fixed when every cell uses the same shift $r$. As shown below using the primitive function, exactly one polynomial of degree at most $k-1$ has the prescribed average over each of these $k$ cells. If $u$ is smooth throughout the stencil, that polynomial is $k$th-order accurate. The face values depend linearly on the averages:
$$u^-_{i+1/2} = \sum_{j=0}^{k-1} c_{r,j}\,\bar{u}_{i-r+j},$$
$$u^+_{i-1/2} = \sum_{j=0}^{k-1} c_{r-1,j}\,\bar{u}_{i-r+j}.$$
The constants $c_{r,j}$ depend on $k$, on the shift $r$, and on the cell widths, but not on the data. On a nonuniform grid the widths change from cell to cell, so the constants do too, and they can be computed once for each cell before the calculation starts. They follow from requiring the polynomial's average over each cell of the stencil to equal that cell's average: these $k$ independent linear equations determine the polynomial, so its value at a face is a fixed combination of the averages, whose weights are the $c_{r,j}$. For $k = 2$ and the stencil $\{I_i, I_{i+1}\}$, for example, the polynomial is the straight line that takes each cell's average at the cell's center, and
$$u^-_{i+1/2} = \frac{\Delta x_{i+1}\,\bar{u}_i + \Delta x_i\,\bar{u}_{i+1}}{\Delta x_i + \Delta x_{i+1}},$$
in which each average is weighted by the width of the other cell.

The stencils of the table, drawn on the grid. The numbers in each row are the coefficients c_{r,j} of the cell averages in the value at the face x_{i+1/2} (vertical line), with positive coefficients in blue and negative ones in red.

On a uniform grid the coefficients do not depend on the cell or on the grid spacing, so they can be tabulated once:

Coefficients $c_{r,j}$ on a uniform grid
$k$	$r$	$s$	$j=0$	$j=1$	$j=2$
1	−1	1	1		
1	0	0	1		
2	−1	2	3/2	−1/2	
2	0	1	1/2	1/2	
2	1	0	−1/2	3/2	
3	−1	3	11/6	−7/6	1/3
3	0	2	1/3	5/6	−1/6
3	1	1	−1/6	5/6	1/3
3	2	0	1/3	−7/6	11/6

Here $s = k - r - 1$, and the rows with $r = -1$ give the value $u^+_{i-1/2}$ for a stencil with $r = 0$. A formula for the coefficients for any $k$ can be obtained from the primitive function, described next.

=== The primitive function ===
The polynomial and the coefficients can be found by turning reconstruction into ordinary interpolation. At a given time $t$, let
$$U(x) = \int_{a}^{x} u(\eta, t)\,d\eta$$
for some fixed $a$. This is a primitive, or antiderivative, of $u(x, t)$ in $x$: its derivative is $dU/dx = u(x, t)$. Although $u(x, t)$ is not known at the faces, $U(x)$ is. Taking $a$ to be a cell face, $U(x_{i+1/2})$ is the sum of $\bar{u}_j \Delta x_j$ over the cells from $a$ to $x_{i+1/2}$.

If $P(x)$ is the polynomial of degree at most $k$ that interpolates $U(x)$ at the $k+1$ faces of a stencil, its derivative $p(x) = dP/dx$ has the required averages. Over each cell of the stencil, the average of $p(x)$ is the change in $P(x)$ across the cell divided by the cell's width, which equals the cell's average because $P(x)$ matches $U(x)$ at the faces. Standard interpolation theory gives $dP/dx = dU/dx + O(\Delta x^k)$ wherever $U(x)$ is smooth, which is the required accuracy. This reconstruction via the primitive function goes back to the piecewise parabolic method of Colella and Woodward. An alternative, reconstruction via deconvolution, which requires a uniform mesh, is also possible.

Writing $P(x)$ in Lagrange form gives the coefficients explicitly. On a uniform grid, with the faces of the stencil numbered from 0 to $k$ starting on the left, they are
$$c_{r,j} = \sum_{m=j+1}^{k} \frac{\displaystyle\sum_{n=0,\,n\neq m}^{k}\ \prod_{q=0,\,q\neq m,n}^{k} (r-q+1)}{\displaystyle\prod_{n=0,\,n\neq m}^{k} (m-n)}.$$

== Choosing the stencil ==
=== Why a fixed stencil oscillates ===
A fixed stencil oscillates wherever it straddles a discontinuity. With the third-order stencil $r=1$ on a uniform grid, and cell averages equal to 1 up to cell $I_i$ and 0 from $I_{i+1}$ on, the stencil of $I_i$ sees the averages 1, 1, 0. The table gives its value at the left face as $\tfrac{1}{3} + \tfrac{5}{6} = \tfrac{7}{6}$, above the jump, and the polynomial of $I_{i+1}$ likewise reaches $-\tfrac{1}{6}$ at its right face, below it. The coefficients are pure numbers, so these values do not change as $\Delta x$ shrinks. The overshoot stays a fixed fraction of the jump however fine the grid, which is what makes the oscillation Gibbs-like.

The polynomial is accurate only if $u$ is smooth throughout the stencil, and this stencil contains the discontinuity. Shifting the stencil of $I_i$ one cell to the left, to $r=2$, gives the averages 1, 1, 1, the constant polynomial 1, and no overshoot. ENO makes such choices from the data alone, without being told where the discontinuity is.

=== Divided differences as a measure of smoothness ===
ENO compares the smoothness of candidate stencils with divided differences, which are defined recursively by
$$w[x_i] = w(x_i)$$
and
$$w[x_i, \dots, x_{i+j}] = \frac{w[x_{i+1}, \dots, x_{i+j}] - w[x_i, \dots, x_{i+j-1}]}{x_{i+j} - x_i}.$$
Where $w$ is smooth, a divided difference is a scaled derivative. By the mean value theorem for divided differences,
$$w[x_i, \dots, x_{i+j}] = \frac{1}{j!} \left.\frac{d^j w}{dx^j}\right|_{x = \zeta}$$
for some $\zeta$ in the interval spanned by the points, so it stays bounded as the grid is refined. If $w$ instead has a jump in its $p$th derivative there, the divided difference is of size $O(\Delta x^{p-j})$ times that jump, which grows without bound as $\Delta x \to 0$ when $p < j$. A large divided difference therefore signals a discontinuity, and comparing the sizes of divided differences shows which of two stencils is the smoother.

Third-order ENO choosing the stencils of the two cells beside a jump, from six cell averages on a uniform grid. At each step it compares the differences on the two sides and adds the cell on the side where the difference is smaller in magnitude, so each stencil stays on its own side of the jump. A fixed stencil centered on each cell (dashed) crosses the jump and overshoots.

The differences needed for reconstruction are those of the primitive $U$, and the averages give them directly:
$$U[x_{i-1/2}, x_{i+1/2}] = \bar{u}_i,$$
$$U[x_{i-1/2}, x_{i+1/2}, x_{i+3/2}] = \frac{\bar{u}_{i+1} - \bar{u}_i}{x_{i+3/2} - x_{i-1/2}},$$
and so on. The constant term of $P$ vanishes when it is differentiated, so $U$ itself never has to be computed.

=== Adding one cell at a time ===
ENO grows the stencil from the target cell outward, one neighbor at a time, each time on the side where the data look smoother. Interpolating $U$ at the two faces of the target cell gives the straight line
$$P^{(1)}(x) = U[x_{i-1/2}] + U[x_{i-1/2}, x_{i+1/2}]\,(x - x_{i-1/2}).$$
A third point can be the face to the left or the face to the right. In Newton form, either choice adds a multiple of the same quadratic:
$$P(x) = P^{(1)}(x) + d\,(x - x_{i-1/2})(x - x_{i+1/2}),$$
where $d$ is $U[x_{i-3/2}, x_{i-1/2}, x_{i+1/2}]$ for the left face and $U[x_{i-1/2}, x_{i+1/2}, x_{i+3/2}]$ for the right. The two candidates differ only through $d$, so the one with the smaller $|d|$ stays closer to the lower-degree interpolant and comes from the smoother data. The same comparison decides each later point.

How ENO grows a third-order stencil for the cell I_{i} (outlined) on a non-uniform grid, following the procedure in the text. Each candidate stencil is labeled with its divided difference $d^l_j$, which divides by the width the stencil spans, and each step keeps the candidate whose difference is smaller in magnitude. The three possible stencils reach r = 2, 1, or 0 cells to the left, and r = 1 can be reached in two ways.

In terms of cells, the divided difference of $U$ over the faces of the $l+1$ cells $I_j, \dots, I_{j+l}$ is written $d^l_j$, so that $d^0_j = \bar{u}_j$. A stencil $I_m, \dots, I_{m+l-1}$ then gains the cell $I_{m-1}$ if $|d^l_{m-1}| < |d^l_m|$, and the cell $I_{m+l}$ otherwise. After $k-1$ steps the stencil has $k$ cells, and its shift is $r = i - m$. On a uniform grid the two candidates at each step are divided by the same factor, so undivided differences make the same choices, which saves time and reduces round-off error.

The target cell stays in the stencil throughout, which is what conservation requires. The $k$ possible stencils together cover $2k-1$ cells, but only one of them is used. Other ways of measuring smoothness are possible, such as comparing the highest-degree differences of all the candidates directly, but the one-cell-at-a-time hierarchy has proved the most robust on both coarse and fine grids.

== From reconstruction to a scheme ==
=== Finite-volume form ===
Replacing each exact face flux in the cell-average equation by a numerical flux gives the semi-discrete scheme
$$\frac{d\bar{u}_i}{dt} = -\frac{1}{\Delta x_i}\left(\hat{f}_{i+1/2} - \hat{f}_{i-1/2}\right),$$
where
$$\hat{f}_{i+1/2} = \hat{f}\big(u^-_{i+1/2}, u^+_{i+1/2}\big).$$
Since the flux leaving one cell enters the next, the scheme is conservative, and by the Lax–Wendroff theorem any limit to which it converges is a weak solution. The two-point function $\hat{f}(a,b)$ is a monotone flux: Lipschitz continuous, non-decreasing in $a$, non-increasing in $b$, and consistent in the sense that $\hat{f}(a,a)=f(a)$. Examples are the Godunov, Engquist–Osher, and Lax–Friedrichs fluxes, the last of which is
$$\hat{f}(a,b) = \tfrac{1}{2}\left[f(a) + f(b) - \alpha(b-a)\right],$$
with $\alpha = \max_u |df/du|$. The choice matters a great deal at first or second order but much less at high order, so the simple and inexpensive Lax–Friedrichs flux is often enough.

This framework contains the earlier methods. With $k=1$ the reconstruction is piecewise constant, and evolving it exactly is Godunov's scheme. With $k=2$ it is piecewise linear, as in the second-order extensions of Godunov's scheme.

=== Time stepping ===
The first ENO schemes followed the reconstruct–evolve–average pattern of Godunov's scheme. They approximated the evolution over a time step by the Lax–Wendroff procedure, a Taylor expansion in time, which becomes complicated at high order and in several dimensions.

A simpler approach, and now probably the most widely used, treats the semi-discrete scheme as a large system of ordinary differential equations, $d\bar{u}/dt = L(\bar{u})$ (the method of lines), and advances it with a Runge–Kutta method chosen not to add oscillations of its own. The most common choice is the third-order method
$$\begin{aligned}
u^{(1)} &= u^n + \Delta t\,L(u^n), \\
u^{(2)} &= \tfrac{3}{4}u^n + \tfrac{1}{4}u^{(1)} + \tfrac{1}{4}\Delta t\,L(u^{(1)}), \\
u^{n+1} &= \tfrac{1}{3}u^n + \tfrac{2}{3}u^{(2)} + \tfrac{2}{3}\Delta t\,L(u^{(2)}).
\end{aligned}$$
Every stage is a convex combination of forward Euler steps, so any stability property that forward Euler has in a norm or semi-norm under a time-step limit holds for the full method under the same limit. These methods were first called TVD Runge–Kutta methods and are now also known as strong-stability-preserving (SSP) methods. With a Runge–Kutta method that is not SSP, oscillations can appear even when the spatial discretization produces none.

=== Finite-difference form ===
The scheme can also be written in conservative finite-difference form, which evolves point values $u_i(t) \approx u(x_i,t)$ instead of cell averages:
$$\frac{du_i}{dt} = -\frac{1}{\Delta x}\left(\hat{f}_{i+1/2} - \hat{f}_{i-1/2}\right).$$
The values $f(u_i)$ are the cell averages of a function whose values at the two faces of a cell give the derivative of the flux at its center exactly. So the same ENO routine, using $f(u_i)$ instead of $\bar{u}_i$, returns the numerical flux $\hat{f}_{i+1/2}$.

In one dimension the two forms therefore cost the same, but in several spatial dimensions a finite-volume scheme of the same order costs several times as much. Above second order, however, the finite-difference form needs a uniform or smoothly varying grid, whereas the finite-volume form works on arbitrary meshes, so the finite-difference form is preferred whenever the problem allows such a grid.

Because the finite-difference form reconstructs the flux itself, the upwinding has to be built into the stencil: the ENO choice starts from the point on the side the waves come from, and starting from the wrong side can make the scheme unstable. For a nonlinear flux, that side can change from face to face. ENO-Roe takes it from the sign of the Roe speed, the slope of $f(u)$ between neighboring points, which is simple but can converge to an entropy-violating expansion shock. Flux splitting is more robust. It writes $f(u) = f^+(u) + f^-(u)$, with $df^+/du \ge 0$ and $df^-/du \le 0$, and reconstructs each part from its own upwind side. ENO-LLF uses the Lax–Friedrichs splitting $f^\pm(u) = \tfrac{1}{2}\big(f(u) \pm \alpha u\big)$, with $\alpha$ at least the largest $|df/du|$ near each face.

=== Systems of equations ===
For a system, $u$ and $f(u)$ are vectors. Reconstructing each component separately is satisfactory for smooth solutions and weak shocks, but with strong shocks it can produce spurious oscillations, more so at higher orders. A more robust approach uses local characteristic variables, in which a linear system decouples into scalar advection equations. At each face the data are projected onto the eigenvectors of the Jacobian matrix $\partial f/\partial u$ at an average state, each characteristic field is reconstructed as a scalar, and the results are projected back. The projection changes from face to face, which makes this approach more expensive.

=== Several spatial dimensions ===
The two forms differ most in several dimensions. A genuinely two-dimensional reconstruction runs into difficulties that have no counterpart in one dimension. A full polynomial of degree $k-1$ in two variables has $k(k+1)/2$ coefficients, so its stencil needs that many cells, and there are many more ways to choose them than in one dimension. Some choices fail altogether. For example, for three cells in a row, no linear polynomial $p(x,y)$ need match the three averages, and when one does, its slope across the row is left undetermined. The difficulty is even greater on triangles.

On rectangular meshes this is avoided by using products of one-dimensional polynomials. The primitive becomes $U(x,y) = \int^{y}\!\int^{x} u(\eta,\theta,t)\,d\eta\,d\theta$, which the cell averages give exactly at the cell corners. Interpolating $U$ there with such a product polynomial $P(x,y)$ and taking the mixed derivative $p(x,y) = \partial^2 P/\partial x\,\partial y$ gives a reconstruction with the right averages and accuracy. In practice this amounts to two one-dimensional reconstructions in turn, first in one direction and then in the other, so it costs $n$ one-dimensional reconstructions per cell in $n$ dimensions. Product polynomials have more terms than the order of accuracy needs, but there is no natural way to use the smaller set. The flux through each face is then an integral, which needs several quadrature points once the order is above two, with a reconstruction at each one.

A slotted disk turned twice about the center of a periodic domain on 100 × 100 grid cells, with each scheme applied one grid line at a time. First-order upwind smears the disk, and the second-order centered scheme fills the domain with ripples. A fixed third-order stencil overshoots (red) and undershoots (blue) around the edges, while third-order ENO keeps the slot open without either.

A finite-difference scheme avoids all of this. It applies the one-dimensional flux formula along each grid line, with the other indices fixed, so it is as simple in several dimensions as it is in one. By one estimate, the finite-difference form takes about a quarter of the operations in two dimensions and a ninth in three, and by a later one, a two-dimensional finite-volume scheme of order above two costs two to five times as much as the finite-difference form.

On unstructured meshes, such as triangles, neither one-dimensional sweeps nor a conservative finite-difference form is available, so the finite-volume form must be used. The ENO idea still carries over: build candidate polynomials on several stencils of nearby cells, and choose the smoothest using a suitable analog of the divided differences. The first such scheme was constructed in 1994, and ENO on unstructured meshes remains less developed than on structured ones.

=== Boundaries ===
Near a boundary, a stencil can reach past the last cell into ghost cells outside the domain. With periodic boundaries the ghost values are copied from the other end of the domain, and at a reflecting wall or a symmetry line they follow by symmetry or antisymmetry. At other boundaries, the stencil choice can be restricted to values inside the domain, which the original authors found strongly stable in experiments. One way to arrange this without extra logic is to fill the ghost cells with very large, rapidly varying values, which the selection rule then avoids by itself.

Alternatively, the ghost values can be set by extrapolation of suitable order, which gives a stable scheme at an outflow boundary. At an inflow boundary, where high-order extrapolation is hard to make stable, the inverse Lax–Wendroff procedure uses the equation to turn space derivatives at the boundary into time derivatives, which the boundary condition supplies, and a Taylor expansion in space then gives the ghost values. A scheme can also switch near a boundary to shorter, lower-order stencils biased away from it. A boundary treatment one order less accurate than the interior scheme still allows the interior scheme its full order of accuracy.

== Properties ==
=== What "essentially non-oscillatory" means ===
Being essentially non-oscillatory is a weaker property than being non-oscillatory: small oscillations are allowed. A reconstruction $R(x)$ of a piecewise smooth function is required to be accurate to order $k$ wherever the function is smooth and to reproduce the cell averages. It is essentially non-oscillatory if, in addition, its total variation exceeds that of the function by at most a small amount:
$$\mathrm{TV}(R) \le \mathrm{TV}(u) + O(\Delta x^k).$$
The bound rules out oscillations as large as a jump, the Gibbs-like behavior of a fixed stencil. It allows only small ones, of the size of the truncation error, which arise only where the solution is smooth and fade as the grid resolves it. Some are unavoidable: samples of a smooth function near its maximum lie below the maximum, so an accurate interpolant has to rise above them. Allowing them is what makes high order possible, since schemes that allow no new extrema at all are limited to second order. In practice, shocks computed with ENO look monotone.

The stencil choice is what achieves this bound. Away from discontinuities the stencils avoid them, so the reconstruction keeps its full accuracy right up to the cell that contains a discontinuity. In that cell no stencil can be accurate, and the error is of order one, but the polynomial there is monotone and so adds no oscillation; for a step, this follows from Rolle's theorem.

These properties concern the approximation of a known piecewise smooth function. In a time-dependent calculation the data already carry accumulated numerical errors, and discontinuities may not stay well separated, so the bound can no longer be proved for the numerical solution. It has only been conjectured, on the basis of heuristic analysis and numerical experiments. Even such a bound would not rule out large oscillations in principle, since the variation could grow by a small amount at every time step.

=== Sign property ===
A stability property of ENO reconstruction that needs no smoothness at all was proved in general only in 2013, more than 25 years after ENO schemes were introduced. Known as the sign property, it says that at every cell face the jump in the reconstructed values has the same sign as the jump in the cell averages, and that their ratio is bounded:
$$0 \le \frac{u^+_{i+1/2} - u^-_{i+1/2}}{\bar{u}_{i+1} - \bar{u}_i} \le C,$$
where $C$ depends only on $k$ and on the ratios of neighboring cell widths. If two neighboring averages are equal, the reconstruction is continuous across their common face. The result holds for any order, on non-uniform meshes, and for arbitrary data, and it excludes a sawtooth in which averages rise across a face while the reconstruction falls.

The proof depends on the particular stencil rule. The property can fail for other choices, including the usual WENO weights, and it cannot be proved for biased ENO. It does not imply that the reconstruction has bounded total variation, because the variation inside a cell can still be large.

Its importance is mainly theoretical. The result is a guarantee about the standard ENO procedure and leaves the procedure itself unchanged. Its main application has been to entropy-stable ENO schemes of arbitrarily high order for systems of conservation laws, introduced in 2012, and together with the bound on the ratio it gives a proof that these schemes converge for linear equations.

=== Stencil switching and loss of accuracy ===
The order of an ENO scheme is defined through its local truncation error, which does not by itself fix how fast the global error converges. In one study of simple advection with the initial condition $\sin^4 x$, the error of an ENO scheme did not decrease steadily under grid refinement and could even increase, though the same scheme converged as expected for $\sin x$.

Some of the candidate stencils, taken alone, give linearly unstable schemes, and the selection rule can choose them throughout a smooth region. For $e^{-x}$ advected to the right, for example, all the derivatives are monotone, so the comparisons always favor the same side, and the chosen stencil is the maximally downwind one. The original authors had chosen initial data that made the rule pick the downwind stencil on purpose, to show that linear stability analysis does not apply. Once oscillations began to appear in the highest derivative, the stencil changed orientation, and the instability never built up. The switching keeps the scheme stable, but it costs accuracy.

Near zeros of the solution or its derivatives, the two differences being compared can both be tiny, so even round-off error can change the stencil, although such free adaptation serves no purpose in smooth regions. In one example, a smooth tracer with added noise of size 10^{−4}, rotated as a solid body, develops visible irregularities at an unpredictable moment, which then gradually decay.

The stencil that third-order ENO chooses for each cell (colors) as a smooth pulse is advected, without (left) and with (right) noise of size 10^{−4}. The noise is invisible in the solution, but where the pulse's tails are nearly flat it decides the stencil, which then changes erratically.

A remedy is to bias the choice toward a preferred stencil, such as a central or one-point-upwind one, which the rule leaves only if the alternative is smoother by a factor $b > 1$, with a suggested value of $b = 2$. At no extra cost, this recovered the expected order on linear test problems with smooth initial data, and on problems with discontinuities the results were comparable to standard ENO. A more recent review describes the issue as resolved by this biasing, although the sign property cannot be proved for biased ENO.

=== Stability and convergence ===
ENO schemes are nonlinear even for linear equations, so the usual Fourier stability analysis does not apply. Second-order ENO schemes are TVD, but no convergence result was known for higher orders, even for smooth solutions. As of 2018, there was still no robust theory of ENO schemes, and the sign property was the only significant result known about the reconstruction. An ENO scheme can be made provably convergent by capping its difference from a first-order monotone scheme with a mesh-dependent bound, but the quality of the solution then depends strongly on the cap, which makes the modified scheme impractical.

In practice ENO schemes have long been used successfully and have proved robust, although they can allow somewhat more overshoot and oscillation than other methods, such as typical flux-limited TVD schemes, and the difference grows with the order. They can also have trouble converging to steady states, because the abrupt choice of stencil makes the approximation less smooth.

=== Comparison on an advection test ===
A profile with smooth and discontinuous parts advected four times round a periodic domain on 200 grid cells, with the exact solution in black. Top: first-order upwind, which smears everything; second-order centered, whose oscillations spread through the whole domain; and TVD schemes with the minmod and superbee limiters, which flatten the peaks or square them off. Middle: fixed stencils of orders 2 to 5, which oscillate at the jumps at every order. Bottom: ENO of orders 2 to 5, without visible oscillations, and from third order on following the smooth peaks closely. All twelve use the same time stepping and differ only in their values at the cell faces.

A standard test for schemes such as ENO advects a profile that combines a narrow but smooth peak built from three Gaussians, a square wave, a sharp triangle, and half an ellipse on the periodic interval $-1 \le x \le 1$. (Note: The schemes compared are general methods for conservation laws, although in atmospheric and oceanic modeling, methods like these are often called advection schemes.) The exact solution is the initial profile moving to the right unchanged, so any difference from it is numerical error. Some parts have jumps or corners, while others are smooth but sharply peaked, so a scheme may smear the jumps and corners or flatten the narrow peaks, and one that does well on one shape can do worse on another.

First-order upwind does not oscillate, but its numerical diffusion smears every feature of the profile. The second-order centered scheme has no numerical diffusion, only numerical dispersion, so nothing in the spatial discretization damps the short waves produced at the jumps. The centered scheme and the fixed stencils are linear schemes, so by Godunov's theorem they cannot both avoid oscillations and be more than first-order accurate, and near the jumps and corners they create maxima and minima that the exact solution does not have. The TVD schemes keep the jumps free of oscillations, but fall to first order at smooth extrema. Of the usual limiters, minmod is the most dissipative, while superbee allows the most compression, which sharpens the jumps but tends to turn smooth waves into square ones. Second-order ENO differs from the minmod scheme only at extrema, where it keeps the smaller slope instead of setting the slope to zero. At higher orders ENO allows new extrema only at the level of the truncation error, although its overshoots can be slightly larger than those of a typical TVD scheme, more so at higher orders.

=== Cost and performance ===
The main advantage of ENO over flux-limiter methods is less about its treatment of discontinuities than about keeping high accuracy near smooth extrema. It found second-order ENO more diffusive than a minmod flux-limited scheme and judged it a poor choice in practice, while fourth-order ENO did much better and did not degrade smooth extrema. Another textbook found second-order ENO the best of the methods it covers on its five standard scalar test cases, but also judged ENO schemes more complicated and more costly than typical flux-limited methods.

High-order ENO schemes show their advantage best when discontinuities and fine smooth structure occur together, as in the shock–entropy problem, a standard test in which a Mach 3 shock moves into a sinusoidal density field and leaves fine structure in the density behind it. In the study that introduced the test, third-order ENO resolved that structure much better than a second-order TVD scheme. Contact discontinuities remain a weakness: characteristics run into a shock, which steepens it and absorbs errors, but they run parallel to a contact discontinuity, so numerical smearing accumulates over time. If care is not taken, even sixth-order ENO schemes can be too dissipative for turbulence, so direct numerical simulations of shock–turbulence interaction have confined the ENO scheme to a narrow region around the shock.

== Extensions and variants ==
In a cell containing a discontinuity, the reconstruction is inaccurate, and at a contact discontinuity this causes smearing that grows over time. Subcell resolution locates the discontinuity within the cell, by extending the polynomials of the two neighboring cells into it and requiring that together they reproduce the cell's average, and then uses those polynomials in place of the inaccurate one. It should be applied only to contact discontinuities, since on shocks it can produce entropy-violating solutions, and it is hard to extend to two dimensions. Artificial compression sharpens contact discontinuities in another way, by increasing the slope of the reconstruction near them, within monotonicity limits. This is the opposite of what a limiter does, and it extends more easily to several dimensions.

The procedure is not tied to polynomials: trigonometric polynomials and other functions can be used, given a suitable counterpart of the divided differences to measure smoothness. ENO also extends to Hamilton–Jacobi equations. In one dimension, the equation $\partial\varphi/\partial t + f(\partial\varphi/\partial x) = 0$ is the conservation law for $u = \partial\varphi/\partial x$, so ENO interpolation can be used to approximate $\partial\varphi/\partial x$ directly. This was exploited for level-set methods in 1988 and developed further in the 1990s.

ENO's stencil choice also has drawbacks of its own. Round-off can change the stencil near zeros of the solution and its derivatives. The numerical flux is not smooth, because the stencil can change between neighboring points. Only one of the $k$ candidate stencils is used, although all $2k-1$ cells together could give order $2k-1$ in smooth regions. Finally, the many logical tests in the stencil choice ran inefficiently on the vector computers of the time. A weighted ENO (WENO) scheme addresses these by using a convex combination of all the candidate stencils, with weights that depend on smoothness. In smooth regions this can reach order $2k-1$, and it removes the logical tests of the stencil choice. WENO has since overtaken ENO in both method development and use.

== History ==
ENO grew out of work on second-order schemes. TVD schemes were introduced in the 1980s, and their loss of accuracy at extrema prompted the search for a weaker condition. In a report of 1985, published in 1987 as the first paper of a series, Ami Harten and Stanley Osher modified the slope of the MUSCL scheme to obtain a second-order scheme that was non-oscillatory in a weaker sense than TVD: the number of local extrema could not increase. A later textbook describes this scheme, known as UNO, as the bridge between the MUSCL scheme and ENO. In the second paper of the series, Harten, Björn Engquist, Osher, and Sukumar Chakravarthy showed that even this condition limits the order of accuracy to two. To go higher, they allowed small new extrema at the level of the truncation error, the condition that gave ENO its name.

The same four authors published the general construction in 1987 in the Journal of Computational Physics, as the third paper of the series, after a 1986 paper of theirs. Sources date ENO to 1987 or to the mid-1980s. In 1997 the journal republished the paper as a classic, for its 30th anniversary, with a preface by Chi-Wang Shu calling the paper's idea "the first successful attempt" at interpolation that is both uniformly high-order accurate and essentially non-oscillatory.

Shu and Osher published the finite-difference form and the TVD Runge–Kutta methods in 1988, and their second paper, in 1989, added ENO-Roe, ENO-LLF, and ways of sharpening contact discontinuities. In 1990 A. M. Rogerson and E. Meiburg reported the loss of accuracy on smooth data, and in a companion paper Shu proposed biased ENO. WENO was introduced by Xu-Dong Liu, Osher, and Tony Chan in 1994 and given its classical form by Guang-Shan Jiang and Shu in 1996. In 2013 Ulrik Fjordholm, Siddhartha Mishra, and Eitan Tadmor proved the sign property.

== Applications ==
ENO schemes have been applied mainly to problems containing both strong shocks and rich smooth structure, for which lower-order methods struggle. These include shock–turbulence interaction, direct numerical simulation of compressible turbulence, shock–vortex interaction and other problems in gas dynamics, relativistic hydrodynamics, incompressible flow, semiconductor device simulation, and image processing. Hybrid schemes that couple a compact scheme to ENO near shocks were used in early direct numerical simulations of shock–turbulence interaction and of shock–boundary-layer interaction. Hamilton–Jacobi ENO is also used in level-set methods.

== See also ==
- Flux limiter
- High-resolution scheme
- Shock-capturing method
- WENO methods
