= Advection upstream splitting method =

The Advection Upstream Splitting Method (AUSM) is a numerical method used to solve the advection equation in computational fluid dynamics. It is particularly useful for simulating compressible flows with shocks and discontinuities.

The AUSM is developed as a numerical inviscid flux function for solving a general system of conservation equations. It is based on the upwind concept and was motivated to provide an alternative approach to other upwind methods, such as the Godunov method, flux difference splitting methods by Roe, and Solomon and Osher, flux vector splitting methods by Van Leer, and Steger and Warming.

The AUSM first recognizes that the inviscid flux consist of two physically distinct parts, i.e., convective and pressure fluxes. The former is associated with the flow (advection) speed, while the latter with the acoustic speed; or respectively classified as the linear and nonlinear fields. Currently, the convective and pressure fluxes are formulated using the eigenvalues of the flux Jacobian matrices. The method was originally proposed by Liou and Steffen for the typical compressible aerodynamic flows, and later substantially improved in to yield a more accurate and robust version. To extend its capabilities, it has been further developed in for all speed-regimes and multiphase flow. Its variants have also been proposed.

== Features ==
The Advection Upstream Splitting Method has many features. The main features are:

- accurate capturing of shock and contact discontinuities
- entropy-satisfying solution
- positivity-preserving solution
- algorithmic simplicity (not requiring explicit eigen-structure of the flux Jacobian matrices) and straightforward extension to additional conservation laws
- free of “carbuncle” phenomena
- uniform accuracy and convergence rate for all Mach numbers.

Since the method does not specifically require eigenvectors, it is especially attractive for the system whose eigen-structure is not known explicitly, as the case of two-fluid equations for multiphase flow.

== Applications ==
The AUSM has been employed to solve a wide range of problems, low-Mach to hypersonic aerodynamics, large eddy simulation and aero-acoustics, direct numerical simulation, multiphase flow, galactic relativistic flow etc.

== See also ==
- Euler equations
- Finite volume method
- Flux limiter
- Godunov's theorem
- High resolution scheme
- Numerical method of lines
- Sergei K. Godunov
- Total variation diminishing
