= Advection scheme =

Numerical method for transport by fluid flow

In the numerical modeling of fluid flow, particularly in numerical weather prediction, ocean modeling, and climate modeling, an advection scheme (or transport scheme) is the numerical method used to discretize the advection equation, or the advection terms in a model's governing equations, such as the Navier–Stokes equations for momentum and the advection–diffusion equations for heat, salt, moisture, and chemical tracers. It is the part of a model that computes how these quantities are carried by the resolved flow.

The underlying techniques belong to the wider subjects of numerical methods for partial differential equations and computational fluid dynamics. The name "advection scheme" reflects the usage of geophysics, where the transport of a quantity by the velocity field is called advection and "convection" is generally reserved for thermally forced circulations. In many other disciplines the two words are essentially interchangeable, and the same methods appear elsewhere in computational fluid dynamics as discretizations of the "convective" terms.

Desirable properties of an advection scheme include conservation of the transported quantity, monotonicity (no spurious new maxima or minima), low numerical diffusion and dispersion, accuracy, and low computational cost. These cannot all be achieved together, and in practice every scheme trades some of them off against others. The choice of scheme can materially affect a simulation as overshoots and undershoots can produce negative concentrations or spurious supersaturation of moisture, and in ocean climate models truncation errors in the advection scheme can cause spurious mixing across density surfaces that is large compared with the very weak mixing of the ocean interior. By Godunov's theorem, a linear scheme that is monotonic can be at most first-order accurate: the first-order upwind scheme is free of spurious extrema but strongly diffusive, whereas higher-order linear schemes retain sharp gradients better but generate unphysical oscillations.

Many schemes are therefore nonlinear, relying on flux limiters, flux-corrected transport, total variation diminishing constructions, or successive anti-diffusive corrections as in MPDATA. Essentially non-oscillatory (ENO) schemes choose the interpolation stencil adaptively, using the smoothest of several candidates, and weighted essentially non-oscillatory (WENO) schemes use a weighted average of the fluxes computed on all the candidate stencils. Their main advantage over flux-limited schemes is that they remain high-order accurate near smooth maxima and minima. Semi-Lagrangian schemes are also widely used in atmospheric models, since their time step is not restricted by the advective CFL number. A different approach is the second-order moments scheme introduced by Michael Prather for the three-dimensional advection of trace species, which represents the tracer concentration within each grid cell by its own second-order polynomial and conserves the second-order moments of the tracer distribution during advection.

== See also ==
- Numerical solution of the convection–diffusion equation
- High-resolution scheme
- MUSCL scheme
- Finite volume method
- Atmospheric model
- Ocean general circulation model
