= Guergana Petrova =

Bulgarian applied mathematician

Guergana Petrova is an applied mathematician known for her research on numerical methods for solving differential equations. She is a professor of mathematics at Texas A&M University.

== Education and career ==
Petrova earned bachelor's and master's degrees from Sofia University. She moved to the US for her doctoral studies, completing a Ph.D. at the University of South Carolina.

She joined the University of Michigan mathematics department as a visiting assistant professor and then moved to Texas A&M. At Texas A&M, she is also affiliated with the Institute for Applied Mathematics and Computational Science.
