= Lax–Wendroff theorem =

In computational mathematics, the Lax–Wendroff theorem, named after Peter Lax and Burton Wendroff, states that if a conservative numerical scheme for a hyperbolic system of conservation laws converges, then it converges towards a weak solution.

== See also ==
- Lax–Wendroff method
- Godunov's scheme
