= WENO methods =

Scheme used in the numerical solution of hyperbolic partial differential equations

In numerical solution of differential equations, WENO (weighted essentially non-oscillatory) methods are classes of high-resolution schemes. WENO are used in the numerical solution of hyperbolic partial differential equations. These methods were developed from ENO methods (essentially non-oscillatory). The first WENO scheme was developed by Liu, Osher and Chan in 1994. In 1996, Guang-Shan Jiang and Chi-Wang Shu developed a new WENO scheme called WENO-JS. Nowadays, there are many WENO methods.

== See also ==
- High-resolution scheme
- ENO methods
