= High-resolution scheme =

Scheme used in the numerical solution of partial differential equations

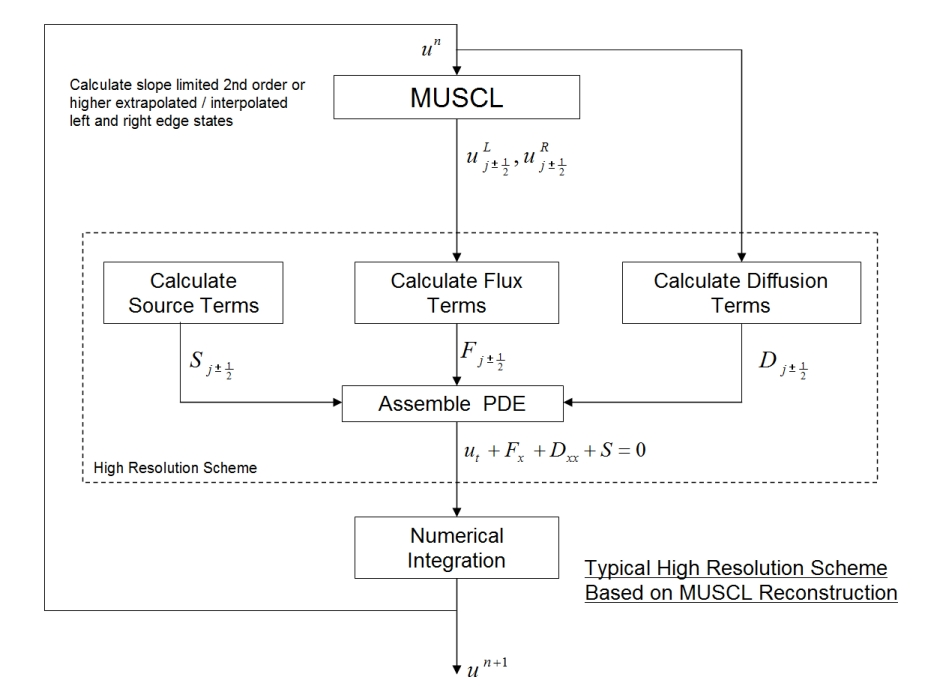
Typical high-resolution scheme based on MUSCL reconstruction.

High-resolution schemes are used in the numerical solution of partial differential equations where high accuracy is required in the presence of shocks or discontinuities. They have the following properties:

- Second- or higher-order spatial accuracy is obtained in smooth parts of the solution.
- Solutions are free from spurious oscillations or wiggles.
- High accuracy is obtained around shocks and discontinuities.
- The number of mesh points containing the wave is small compared with a first-order scheme with similar accuracy.

General methods are often not adequate for accurate resolution of steep gradient phenomena; they usually introduce non-physical effects such as smearing of the solution or spurious oscillations. Since publication of Godunov's order barrier theorem, which proved that linear methods cannot provide non-oscillatory solutions higher than first order (Godunov 1954, Godunov 1959), these difficulties have attracted much attention and a number of techniques have been developed that largely overcome these problems. To avoid spurious or non-physical oscillations where shocks are present, schemes that exhibit a Total Variation Diminishing (TVD) characteristic are especially attractive. Two techniques that are proving to be particularly effective are MUSCL (Monotone Upstream-Centered Schemes for Conservation Laws), a flux/slope limiter method (van Leer 1979, Hirsch 1991, Anderson, Tannehill & Pletcher 2016, Laney 1998, Toro 1999) and the WENO (Weighted Essentially Non-Oscillatory) method (Shu 1998, Shu 2009). Both methods are usually referred to as high resolution schemes (see diagram).

MUSCL methods are generally second-order accurate in smooth regions (although they can be formulated for higher orders) and provide good resolution, monotonic solutions around discontinuities. They are straightforward to implement and are computationally efficient.

For problems comprising both shocks and complex smooth solution structure, WENO schemes can provide higher accuracy than second-order schemes along with good resolution around discontinuities. Most applications tend to use a fifth order accurate WENO scheme, whilst higher order schemes can be used where the problem demands improved accuracy in smooth regions.

The method of holistic discretisation systematically analyses subgrid scale dynamics to algebraically construct closures for numerical discretisations that are both accurate to any specified order of error in smooth regions, and automatically adapt to cater for rapid grid variations through the algebraic learning of subgrid structures (Roberts 2003). A web service analyses any PDE in a class that may be submitted.

== See also ==
- Godunov's theorem
- Sergei K. Godunov
- Total variation diminishing
- Shock capturing method
- Advection scheme
