= Numerical method =

Mathematical tool to algorithmically solve equations

In numerical analysis, a numerical method is a mathematical tool designed to solve numerical problems. The implementation of a numerical method with an appropriate convergence check in a programming language is called a numerical algorithm.

== Mathematical definition ==
Let $F(x,y)=0$ be a well-posed problem, i.e. $F:X \times Y \rightarrow \mathbb{R}$ is a real or complex functional relationship, defined on the Cartesian product of an input data set $X$ and an output data set $Y$, such that exists a locally lipschitz function $g:X \rightarrow Y$ called resolvent, which has the property that for every root $(x,y)$ of $F$, $y=g(x)$. We define numerical method for the approximation of $F(x,y)=0$, the sequence of problems

$$\left \{ M_n \right \}_{n \in \mathbb{N}} = \left \{ F_n(x_n,y_n)=0 \right \}_{n \in \mathbb{N}},$$

with $F_n:X_n \times Y_n \rightarrow \mathbb{R}$, $x_n \in X_n$ and $y_n \in Y_n$ for every $n \in \mathbb{N}$. The problems of which the method consists need not be well-posed. If they are, the method is said to be stable or well-posed.

== Consistency ==
Necessary conditions for a numerical method to effectively approximate $F(x,y)=0$ are that $x_n \rightarrow x$ and that $F_n$ behaves like $F$ when $n \rightarrow \infty$. So, a numerical method is called consistent if and only if the sequence of functions $\left \{ F_n \right \}_{n \in \mathbb{N}}$ pointwise converges to $F$ on the set $S$ of its solutions:

$$\lim F_n(x,y+t) = F(x,y,t) = 0, \quad \quad \forall (x,y,t) \in S.$$

When $F_n=F, \forall n \in \mathbb{N}$ on $S$ the method is said to be strictly consistent.

== Convergence ==
Denote by $\ell_n$ a sequence of admissible perturbations of $x \in X$ for some numerical method $M$ (i.e. $x+\ell_n \in X_n \forall n \in \mathbb{N}$) and with $y_n(x+\ell_n) \in Y_n$ the value such that $F_n(x+\ell_n,y_n(x+\ell_n)) = 0$. A condition which the method has to satisfy to be a meaningful tool for solving the problem $F(x,y)=0$ is convergence:

$$\begin{align}
&\forall \varepsilon > 0, \exist n_0(\varepsilon) > 0, \exist \delta_{\varepsilon, n_0} \text{ such that} \\
&\forall n > n_0, \forall \ell_n : \| \ell_n \| < \delta_{\varepsilon,n_0} \Rightarrow \| y_n(x+\ell_n) - y \| \leq \varepsilon.
\end{align}$$

One can easily prove that the point-wise convergence of $\{y_n\} _{n \in \mathbb{N}}$ to $y$ implies the convergence of the associated method.

== See also ==
- Numerical methods for ordinary differential equations
- Numerical methods for partial differential equations
