= Sergei Godunov =

Russian mathematician (1929–2023)

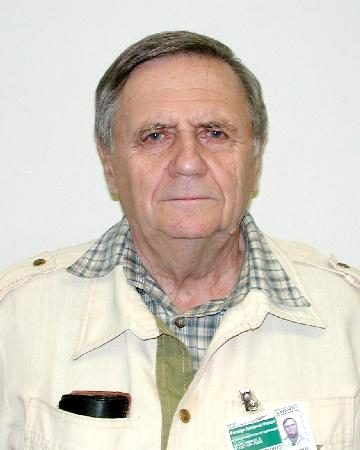
- Godunov in 2002
- Born: Sergei Konstantinovich Godunov; 17 July 1929; Moscow, Russian SFSR, USSR
- Died: 15 July 2023 (aged 93); Novosibirsk, Russia
- Education: Moscow State University
- Known for: Godunov's theorem Godunov's scheme
- Awards: Lenin Prize (1959)
- Scientific career
- Fields: Applied mathematics
- Workplaces: Sobolev Institute of Mathematics, Novosibirsk, Russia
- Doctoral advisor: Ivan Petrovsky

Sergei Konstantinovich Godunov (Russian: Серге́й Константи́нович Годуно́в; 17 July 1929 – 15 July 2023) was a Soviet and Russian professor at the Sobolev Institute of Mathematics of the Russian Academy of Sciences in Novosibirsk, Russia.

== Biography ==
Godunov's most influential work is in the area of applied and numerical mathematics, particularly in the development of methodologies used in Computational Fluid Dynamics (CFD) and other computational fields. Godunov's theorem (Godunov 1959) (also known as Godunov's order barrier theorem) : Linear numerical schemes for solving partial differential equations, having the property of not generating new extrema (a monotone scheme), can be at most first-order accurate. Godunov's scheme is a conservative numerical scheme for solving partial differential equations. In this method, the conservative variables are considered as piecewise constant over the mesh cells at each time step and the time evolution is determined by the exact solution of the Riemann (shock tube) problem at the inter-cell boundaries (Hirsch, 1990).

On 1–2 May 1997 a symposium entitled: Godunov-type numerical methods, was held at the University of Michigan to honour Godunov. These methods are widely used to compute continuum processes dominated by wave propagation. On the following day, 3 May, Godunov received an honorary degree from the University of Michigan. Godunov died on 15 July 2023, two days shy of his 94th birthday.

== Education ==
- 1946–1951 – Department of Mechanics and Mathematics, Moscow State University.
- 1951 – Diploma (M. S.), Moscow State University.
- 1954 – Candidate of Physical and Mathematical Sciences (Ph. D.).
- 1965 – Doctor of Physical and Mathematical Sciences (D. Sc.).
- 1976 – Corresponding member of the Academy of Sciences of the Soviet Union.
- 1994 – Member of the Russian Academy of Sciences (Academician).
- 1997 – Honorary professor of the University of Michigan (Ann-Arbor, USA).

== Awards ==
- 1954 – Order of the Badge of Honour
- 1956 – Order of the Red Banner of Labour
- 1959 – Lenin Prize
- 1972 – A.N. Krylov Prize of the Academy of Sciences of the Soviet Union
- 1975 – Order of the Red Banner of Labour
- 1981 – Order of the Badge of Honour
- 1993 – M.A. Lavrentyev Prize of the Russian Academy of Sciences
- 2010 – Order of Honour
- 2020 - SAE/Ramesh Agarwal Computational Fluid Dynamics Award
- 2023 – Order of Alexander Nevsky

== See also ==
- Riemann solver
- Total variation diminishing
- Upwind scheme
