= Upwind differencing scheme for convection =

The upwind differencing scheme is a method used in numerical methods in computational fluid dynamics for convection–diffusion problems. This scheme is specific for Peclet number greater than 2 or less than −2

== Description ==
By taking into account the direction of the flow, the upwind differencing scheme overcomes that inability of the central differencing scheme. This scheme is developed for strong convective flows with suppressed diffusion effects. Also known as ‘Donor Cell’ Differencing Scheme, the convected value of property $\phi$ at the cell face is adopted from the upstream node.

It can be described by Steady convection-diffusion partial Differential Equation:
$$\frac{\partial}{\partial t}(\rho\phi)+\nabla \cdot (\rho \mathbf{u} \phi)\,= \nabla \cdot (\Gamma \nabla \phi) + S_{\phi}$$

Continuity equation: $\left(\rho u A \right)_{e} - \left(\rho u A \right)_w = 0 \,$

where $\rho$ is density, $\Gamma$ is the diffusion coefficient, $\mathbf{u}$ is the velocity vector, $\phi$ is the property to be computed, $S_\phi$ is the source term, and the subscripts $e$ and $w$ refer to the "east" and "west" faces of the cell (see Fig. 1 below).

After discretization, applying continuity equation, and taking source term equals to zero we get

Central difference discretized equation

$$F_{e} \phi_{e}-F_{w} \phi_{w}\,= D_{e}(\phi_{E}-\phi_{P})-D_{w}(\phi_{P}-\phi_{W})$$	1

$$F_{e} - F_{w} \, = 0$$	2

Lower case denotes the face and upper case denotes node; $E$, $W$, and $P$ refer to the "East," "West," and "Central" cell. (again, see Fig. 1 below).

Defining variable F as convection mass flux and variable D as diffusion conductance
$$F\,= \rho u A$$
and
$$D\,= \frac{\Gamma A}{\delta x}$$

Peclet number (Pe) is a non-dimensional parameter determining the comparative strengths of convection and diffusion

Peclet number:
$$Pe \,= \frac{F}{D} \,= \frac{\rho u}{\Gamma / \delta x}$$

For a Peclet number of lower value (|Pe| < 2), diffusion is dominant and for this the central difference scheme is used. For other values of the Peclet number, the upwind scheme is used for convection-dominated flows with Peclet number (|Pe| > 2).

For positive flow direction

$$\begin{align} u_{w} > 0 \\ u_{e} > 0 \end{align}$$
Corresponding upwind scheme equation:

$$F_{e} \phi_{P}-F_{w} \phi_{W}\,= D_{e}(\phi_{E}-\phi_{P})-D_{w}(\phi_{P}-\phi_{W})$$	3

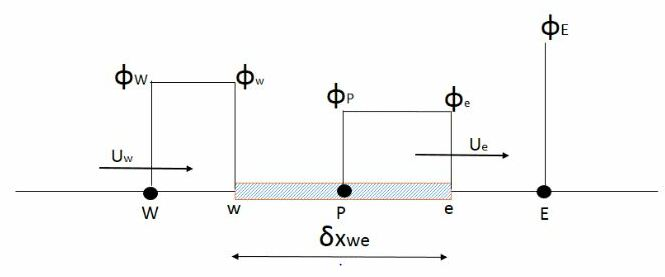
Fig 1:Upwind scheme for positive flow direction

Due to strong convection and suppressed diffusion
$$\begin{align} \phi_{e} \,= \phi_{P} \\ \phi_{w} \,= \phi_{W} \end{align}$$

Rearranging equation (3) gives
$$[(D_{w}+F_{w})+ D_{e}+ (F_{e}-F_{w})]\phi_{P}\, =(D_{w}+F_{w})\phi_{W}+D_{e}\phi_{E}$$

Identifying coefficients,
$$\begin{align}
a_{P} &=   [(D_{w} + F_{w}) + D_{e} + (F_{e} - F_{w})] \\
a_{W} &= (D_{w} + F_{w}) \\
a_{E} &=  D_{e}
\end{align}$$

For negative flow direction
$$\begin{align} u_{w} < 0 \\ u_{e} < 0 \end{align}$$

Corresponding upwind scheme equation:

$$F_{e} \phi_{E}-F_{w} \phi_{P}\,= D_{e}(\phi_{E}-\phi_{P}) - D_{w}(\phi_{P}-\phi_{W})$$	4

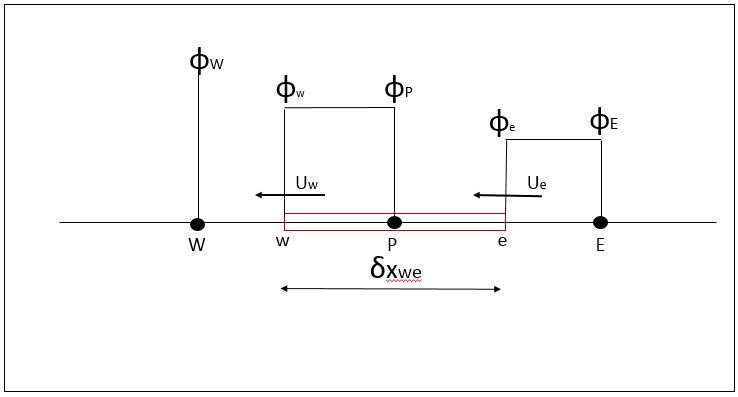
Fig 2: Upwind scheme for negative flow direction

$$\begin{align} \phi_{w} = \phi_{P} \\ \phi_{e} = \phi_{E} \end{align}$$

Rearranging equation (4) gives
$$[( D_e - F_e ) + D_w + ( F_e - F_w )] \phi_{P} = D_w \phi_{W} + ( D_e - F_e ) \phi_{E}$$

Identifying coefficients,
$$\begin{align}
a_{W} &= D_{w} \\
a_{E} &= D_{e} - F_{e}
\end{align}$$

We can generalize coefficients as
$$\begin{align}
a_{W} &= D_{w} + \max(F_{w},0) \\
a_{E} &= D_{e} + \max(0,-F_{e})
\end{align}$$

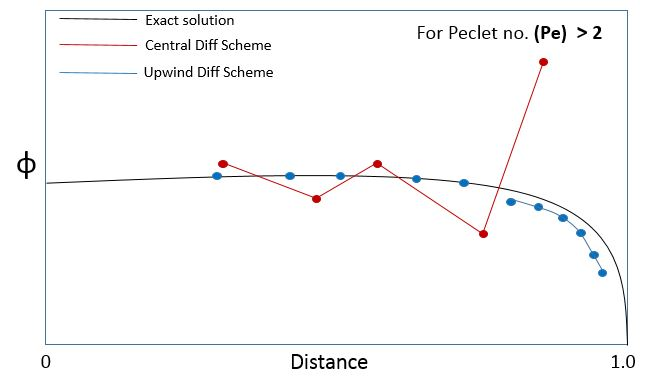
Fig 3: Upwind difference versus central difference

== Use ==
Solution in the central difference scheme fails to converge for Peclet number greater than 2 which can be overcome by using an upwind scheme to give a reasonable result. Therefore the upwind differencing scheme is applicable for Pe > 2 for positive flow and Pe < −2 for negative flow. For other values of Pe, this scheme doesn’t give effective solution.

== Assessment ==
Conservativeness

The upwind differencing scheme formulation is conservative.

Boundedness

As the coefficients of the discretised equation are always positive hence satisfying the requirements for boundedness and also the coefficient matrix is diagonally dominant therefore no irregularities occur in the solution.

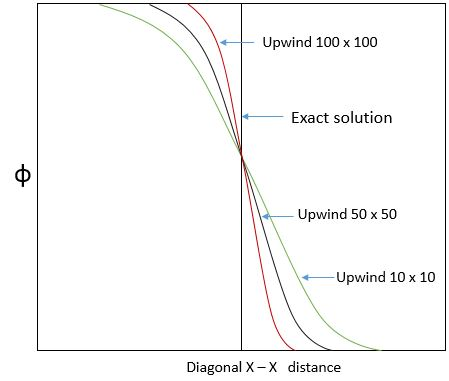
Fig 4: Accuracy and false deviation variation with the grid size

Transportiveness

Transportiveness is built into the formulation as the scheme already accounts for the flow direction.

Accuracy

Based on the backward differencing formula, the accuracy is only first order on the basis of the Taylor series truncation error. It gives error when flow is not aligned with grid lines. Distribution of transported properties become marked giving diffusion-like appearance, called as the false diffusion. Refinement of grid serves in overcoming the issue of false diffusion. With decrease in the grid size, false diffusion decrease thus increasing the accuracy.

== See also ==
- Central differencing scheme
- Finite difference
- Upwind scheme
