= Numerical resistivity =

Problem in computer simulations of ideal magnetohydrodynamics

Numerical resistivity is a problem in computer simulations of ideal magnetohydrodynamics (MHD). It is a form of numerical diffusion. In near-ideal MHD systems, the magnetic field diffuses only very slowly through the plasma or fluid of the system; its rate-limited by the inverse of the resistivity of the fluid. In Eulerian simulations where the field is arbitrarily aligned compared to the simulation grid, the numerical diffusion behaves similarly to an additional resistivity, causing non-physical and sometimes bursty magnetic reconnection in the simulation. Numerical resistivity is influenced by resolution, the alignment of the magnetic field with the grid, and the numerical method used. In general, numerical resistivity does not behave isotropically, and different parts can exhibit varying effective numerical resistivities. For simulations of the solar corona and inner heliosphere as of 2005, this numerical effect can be several orders of magnitude larger than the physical resistivity of the plasma.

== See also ==
- Numerical diffusion
