= Scarborough criterion =

The Scarborough criterion is used for satisfying convergence of a solution while solving linear equations using an iterative method.

== Introduction ==
Analytical solutions for certain systems of equations can be difficult or impossible to obtain. A well known example are the Navier-Stokes equations describing the flow of Newtonian fluids. Solutions of such equations can be obtained numerically, at discrete points of the solution domain (e.g. at discrete time points and points in space). Numerical solutions based on the integration of the equations at discrete control volumes of the solution domain (for example the Finite Volume Method) result in a system of algebraic equations, one for each nodal point (corresponding to a particular control volume). These algebraic equations are usually referred to as discretised equations. The Scarborough criterion formulated by Scarborough (1958), can be expressed in terms of the values of the coefficients of the discretised equations:

$$\frac{\sum |a_{nb}|}{|a'_{p}|} \begin{cases}
\leq 1, & \text{at all nodes}\\
<1, & \text{at one node at least}
\end{cases}$$

Here a'_{p} is the net coefficient of a random central node P and the summation in the numerator is taken over all the neighbouring nodes. For a one, two and three-dimensional problem there will be two (east & west), four (east, west, south & north), and six (east, west, south north, top & bottom) neighbours for each node, respectively.

== Comments ==
- This is a sufficient condition, not a necessary one. This means that we can get convergence, even if, at times, we violate the criterion.
- The satisfaction of this criterion ensures that the equations will be converged by at least one iterative method.

== Gauss–Seidel method ==
If Scarborough criterion is not satisfied then Gauss–Seidel method iterative procedure is not guaranteed to converge a solution. This criterion is a sufficient condition, not a necessary one. If this criterion is satisfied then it means equation will be converged by at least one iterative method. The Scarborough criterion is used as a sufficient condition for convergent iterative method. The finite volume method uses this criterion for obtaining a convergent solution and implementing boundary conditions.

== Diagonal dominance ==
If the differencing scheme produces coefficients that satisfy the above criterion the resulting matrix of coefficients is diagonally dominant. To achieve diagonal dominance we need large values of net coefficient so the linearisation practice of source terms should ensure that S_{P} is always negative. If this is the case –S_{P} is always positive and adds to a_{P}. Diagonal dominance is a desirable feature for satisfying the boundedness criterion. This states that in the absence of sources the internal nodal values of the property ф should be bounded by its boundary values. Hence in a steady state conduction problem without sources and with boundary temperatures of 500 °C and 200 °C all interior values of T should be less than 500 °C and greater than 200 °C.

== See also ==
- Computational fluid dynamics
- Linear equation
