= Power law scheme =

Concept in computational fluid dynamics

The power law scheme was first used by Suhas Patankar (1980). It helps in achieving approximate solutions in computational fluid dynamics (CFD) and it is used for giving a more accurate approximation to the one-dimensional exact solution when compared to other schemes in computational fluid dynamics (CFD). This scheme is based on the analytical solution of the convection diffusion equation. This scheme is also very effective in removing False diffusion error.

== Working ==
The power-law scheme interpolates the face value of a variable, $\phi\,$, using the exact solution to a one-dimensional convection-diffusion equation given below:

$$\frac{\partial}{\partial x}(\rho u \phi)\,= \frac{\partial}{\partial x}\Gamma\frac{\partial \phi}{\partial x}$$

In the above equation Diffusion Coefficient, $\Gamma$ and both the density $\rho$ and velocity remains constant u across the interval of integration.

Integrating the equation, with Boundary Conditions,

$$\phi_0\,= \phi |_{(x=0)}$$
$$\phi_L\,= \phi |_{(x=L)}$$

Variation of face value with distance, x is given by the expression, $\frac{\phi(x)-\phi_0}{\phi_L-\phi_0}\,= \frac{\exp(\text{Pe} \frac{x}{L})-1}{\exp(\text{Pe})-1}$

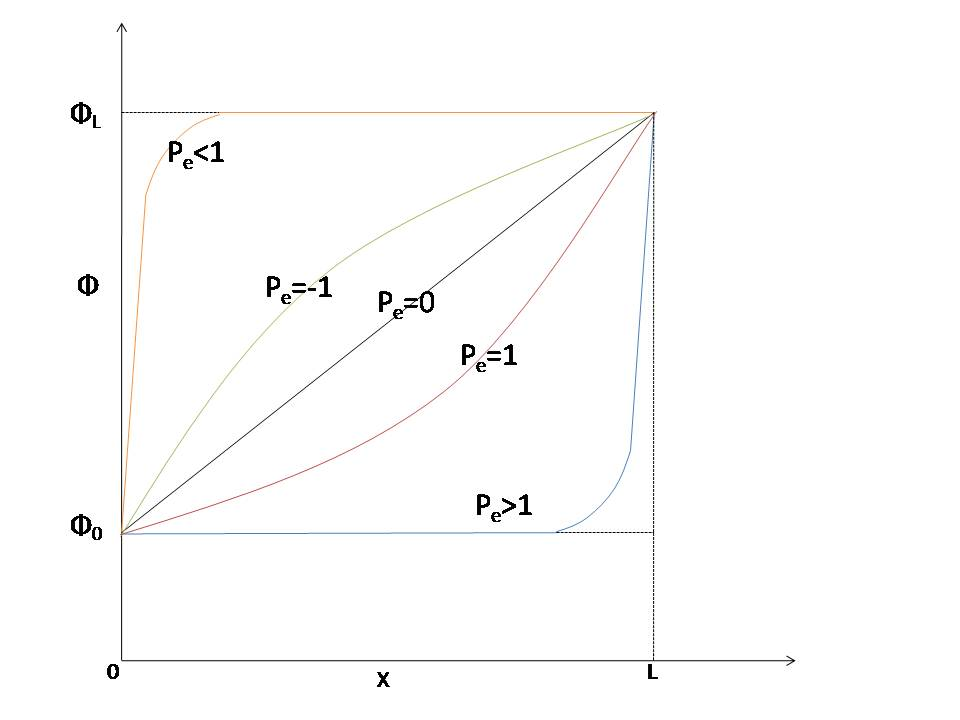
Graph depicting variation of face value with distance for a range of Peclet number.

where Pe is the Peclet number given by $\text{Pe}\,= \frac{\rho u L}{\Gamma}$

Peclet number is defined to be the ratio of the rate of convection of a physical quantity by the flow to the rate of diffusion of the same quantity driven by an appropriate gradient.

The variation between $\phi\,$ and x is depicted in Figure for a range of values of the Peclet number. It shows that for large Pe, the value of $\phi\,$ at x=L/2 is approximately equal to the value at upwind boundary which is assumption made by the upwind differencing scheme. In this scheme diffusion is set to zero when cell Pe exceeds 10.

This implies that when the flow is dominated by convection, interpolation can be completed by simply letting the face value of a variable be set equal to its upwind or upstream value.

When Pe=0 (no flow, or pure diffusion), Figure shows that solution, $\phi\,$ may be interpolated using a simple linear average between the values at x=0 and x=L.

When the Peclet number has an intermediate value, the interpolated value for $\phi\,$ at x=L/2 must be derived by applying the power law equivalent.

The simple average convection coefficient formulation can be replaced with a formula incorporating the power law relationship :

Power Law Relationship
| $a_l$ | $a_r$ |
|---|---|
| $D_l \max [0,(1-0.1|\text{Pe}_l|)^5] + \max[F_l,0]$ | $D_r \max [0,(1-0.1|\text{Pe}_r|)^5] + \max[-F_r,0]$ |

where $F = \rho u,\quad D = \Gamma / L,\quad L = x_r - x_c = x_c - x_l,\quad \text{and} \quad\text{Pe}=F / D$

$F_l,D_l$ and $F_r,D_r$ are the properties on the left node and right node respectively.

The central coefficient is given by $a_c=a_l+a_r+(F_r-F_l)$.

Final coefficient form of the discrete equation: $a_c \phi_c = a_l \phi_l + a_r \phi_r$
