= Dimitris Drikakis =

Greek-British applied scientist, engineer and university professor

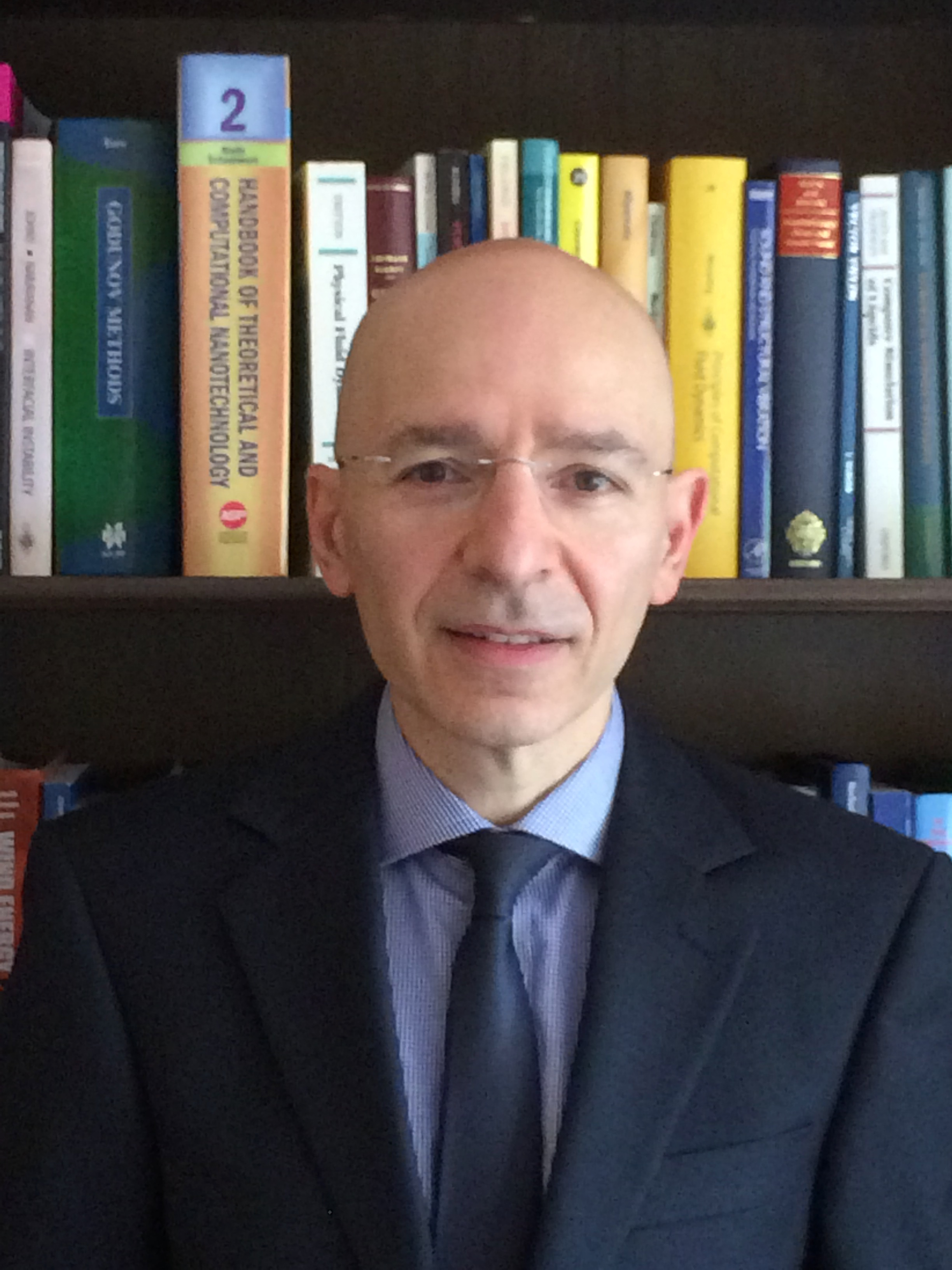
- Born: Dimitris Drikakis; 1965 (age 60–61); Athens, Greece
- Education: National Technical University of Athens
- Scientific career
- Workplaces: Friedrich-Alexander-Universität Erlangen-Nürnberg (Germany); University of Manchester (UK); Queen Mary, University of London (UK); Cranfield University (UK); University of Strathclyde (UK, Scotland); University of Nicosia (Cyprus)
- Website: https://www.unic.ac.cy/drikakis-dimitris/

Dimitris Drikakis, PhD, FRAeS, CEng, is a Greek-British scientist, engineer and university professor. His research is multidisciplinary, encompassing fluid dynamics, artificial intelligence, computational fluid dynamics, acoustics, and computational science. He has applied his research to diverse fields such as the Aerospace and Defence, Biomedical, and Energy and Environment sectors. He received The William Penney Fellowship Award from the Atomic Weapons Establishment (AWE Plc) recognizing his contributions to compressible fluid dynamics. He also won NEF's Innovator of the Year Award from the UK's Institute of Innovation and Knowledge Exchange for developing a new generation of carbon-capture nanotechnology that uses carbon nanotubes to filter carbon dioxide and other gases.

== Education ==
Drikakis obtained his mechanical engineering degree (1982–1987) from the National Technical University of Athens in Greece. His diploma dissertation was in biofluid mechanics and concerned pulsating blood flow in an anisotropic elastic tube.

He completed his PhD (1988–1991) at the National Technical University of Athens (NTUA) in the Laboratory of Aerodynamics, Fluids Section. His PhD was concerned with developing computational fluid dynamics methods for high-speed compressible flows. He was co-supervised by the Flight Physics Division of Messerschmitt-Bölkow-Blohm (MBB), a German aerospace manufacturer formed later on the Airbus Group.

== Career ==
In 1992, Drikakis joined as a research scientist and later on as a team leader at the Institute of Fluid Mechanics (Lehrstuhl für Strömungsmechanik – LSTM) of the University of Erlangen–Nuremberg (Friedrich-Alexander-Universität Erlangen-Nürnberg) under the direction of Professor Franz Durst. He researched fluid dynamics and high-performance parallel computing in the early stages of developing parallel computers.

In 1995, he joined as a lecturer at the University of Manchester Institute of Science and Technology (UMIST), which later merged with the University of Manchester. He worked in the Fluid Mechanics Division under Professor Brian Launder and Professor Michael Leschziner.

In 1999, he was offered a readership (associate professor position) at Queen Mary, University of London and became a full professor (professor of fluid dynamics) at the same university in 2001. He was 36 years of age.

In 2003, he joined Cranfield University as a Professor and Head of the Fluid Mechanics and Computational Science Centre. He was appointed Head of the Aerospace Science Department (2005–2010). In 2012, he established the Department of Engineering Physics at the same university, which later evolved into the Institute of Aerospace Sciences. He left Cranfield in 2015. During his tenure at Cranfield University, he held various management and leadership posts, including the Director of Research in the School of Aerospace, Transport & Manufacturing.

In 2011, he was the founding director of the regional high-performance scientific computing centre at The Cyprus Institute in close partnership with the University of Illinois at Urbana-Champaign, US.

In July 2015, he was appointed as the Executive Dean of the Faculty of Engineering and Professor of Engineering Science at the University of Strathclyde, Glasgow, one of the UK's largest engineering schools. He worked with the Principal and Vice-Chancellor, Professor Sir Jim McDonald (President of the Royal Academy of Engineering). From 2015 to 2018, he held various executive posts as an Associate Principal and Executive d=Director of Global Partnerships.

He left the University of Strathclyde in October 2018 to join the University of Nicosia in Cyprus as the Vice President of Global Partnerships, Executive Director of Research and Innovation, with a full professor (cross-appointment) in the Medical School and the School of Sciences and Engineering. Additionally, he has served as the Dean of the School of Sciences and Engineering since January 2025. The University of Nicosia is a private, English-speaking university, the largest in Cyprus. In 2019, he founded the Institute of Advanced Modelling and Simulation, which incorporates the Defence and Security Research Institute, a multidisciplinary institute dedicated to science and technology and collaboration with governments, industry, and academia worldwide.

== Research ==
Drikakis' research covers several topics, including:

- Advanced computational fluid dynamics methods: High-resolution and high-order methods.
- Artificial Intelligence methods and applications:The development of methods and models with applications in different sectors.
- Transition and turbulence: in the Large Eddy Simulation frame, mainly implicit Large Eddy Simulation, and Direct Numerical Simulation.
- High-speed flows: featuring shock waves, turbulence, and instabilities.
- Multiphase flows: He has developed and applied multiphase fluid dynamics methods to study diverse problems such as compressible fluid/solid interactions, two-phase flows, oil and gas flows, Coronavirus transmission and weather effects.
- Acoustics: acoustic fatigue and noise propagation.
- Bio-Medical: In 2020 and 2021, he published jointly with Dr Talib Dbouk a series of multiphase fluid dynamics papers investigating the contaminated saliva droplet spread, face masks, and the impact of weather on COVID-19.
  - 1. The article by Dbouk, D. Drikakis, On coughing and airborne droplet transmission to humans Phys. Fluids 32, 053310 (2020) received one of the highest Altmetric Scores of all American Institute of Physics publications.
  - 2. The trilogy of articles received public recognition through multiple news outlets coverage worldwide.
- Heat transfer and thermal management: He has developed heat transfer models for a broad range of scales and applications, including micro and nanofluidic devices and fundamental science to understanding solid-fluid interfaces.
- Multiscale continuum and molecular modelling: He has developed coupling methods comprising molecular and continuum mechanics. He implemented these methods in microfluidic devices, amongst other applications.
- Nanotechnology and gas filtration: He developed a new generation of carbon capture technology that uses carbon nanotubes to filter out carbon dioxide and other gases at low or zero energy costs. This platform technology can be used across various applications in the power generation, automotive, aerospace, chemical, marine, and built environment sectors. He has three patents in the UK Patent 2479257-A, US Patent 20130042762, and China Patent CN102892479.

== Other activities ==
Drikakis has been an associate editor in Computers and Fluids, Physics of Fluids (advisory board), The Aeronautical Journal, Journal of Fluids Engineering. He is also on the editorial board of several journals in applied mathematics, engineering, biomedicine, energy, and nanotechnology.

He was on the Fluid Dynamics Technical Committee of the American Institute of Aeronautics and Astronautics (AIAA, on the Board of Directors of the European Aeronautics Science Network (EASN), Experts Panel and deputy chair of the European Research Council (Engineering), amongst other international committees.
