= Piso =

Piso may refer to:

- Lake Piso, Liberia
- Philippine peso (Filipino: piso), the currency of the Philippines
- Piso, Kentucky, an unincorporated community in the United States
- PISO algorithm, in computational fluid dynamics
- Calpurnius Piso (disambiguation), an ancient Roman family name
