= Suhas Patankar =

Indian mechanical engineer

Suhas V. Patankar
- Born: 22 February 1941 (age 85); Pune, Maharashtra, India
- Education: College of Engineering Pune; IIT Bombay; Imperial College London
- Known for: SIMPLE algorithm
- Children: Suphala
- Scientific career
- Fields: Mechanical and Computational Fluid Dynamics
- Workplaces: University of Minnesota
- Doctoral advisor: Brian Spalding

Suhas V. Patankar (born 22 February 1941) is an Indian mechanical engineer. He is a pioneer in the field of computational fluid dynamics (CFD) and Finite volume method. He is currently a Professor Emeritus at the University of Minnesota. He is also president of Innovative Research, Inc. Patankar was born in Pune, Maharashtra, India.

== Early life and education ==
Patankar received his bachelor's degree in mechanical engineering in 1962 from the College of Engineering, Pune, which is affiliated to the University of Pune and his Master of Technology degree in mechanical engineering from the Indian Institute of Technology Bombay in 1964. In 1967 he received his Ph.D. in mechanical engineering from the Imperial College, University of London.

== Career ==
Patankar's most important contribution to the field of CFD is the SIMPLE algorithm that he developed along with his colleagues at Imperial College. Patankar is the author of a book in computational fluid dynamics titled Numerical Heat Transfer and Fluid Flow which was first published in 1980. This book has since been considered one of the groundbreaking contributions to computational fluid dynamics due to its emphasis on physical understanding and insight into the fluid flow and heat transfer phenomena. He is also one of the most cited authors in science and engineering.
