= Suphala =

Suphala is a tabla artist, composer, and producer. She is a protégé of tabla players Ustad Alla Rakha and Zakir Hussain and is based in New York City.

== Background ==
Born in the United States to Indian parents, Suphala has studied music in India. She is trained in both Indian and Western classical music, and has studied piano since the age of four. In January 2005, Suphala was the first artist (and first female artist) to perform in Afghanistan after the fall of the Taliban. According to The New York Times, "Kabul's badly depleted music scene received a welcome injection of excitement last week with the arrival of Suphala, the New York-based tabla player and composer...Suphala certainly brought brightness...her touch and rhythm are sure."

Suphala has recorded and/or performed with Norah Jones, Perry Farrell (Jane's Addiction), Sean Lennon, Harper Simon, Yoko Ono, Edie Brickell, Vernon Reid (Living Color), King Britt, DJ Spooky, DJ Logic, DJ Fafu, Vijay Iyer, 4 Hero, Lady Ms. Kier (Deee-Lite), Nina Hagen, Joan Osborne, Kelly Clarkson, Timbaland, Michael Bland, Yuka Honda (Cibo Matto), Vikter Duplaix, Gingger Shankar, Niladri Kumar, Ustad Sultan Khan, Rakesh Chaurasia, Salim Merchant, and Carol C (Si Se).

She is the daughter of Suhas V. Patankar, a pioneer in the field of computational fluid dynamics.

== Discography ==
Instru Mental, Suphala's first album, was released in September 2000.

Her second album, The Now, released May 10, 2005, features contributions from guest artists Norah Jones, Salim Merchant, Vernon Reid, actor/singer Antonio Banderas, and Niladri Kumar.

Her third album, Blueprint, released 2007, includes the single "I Feel Awake Even Though This Is A Dream", and features contributions from Edie Brickell, producer King Britt, Vernon Reid, bansuri player Rakesh Chaurasia, Harper Simon, Mazz Swift, and David Gotay.
