= Akshai Runchal =

Indian Professor

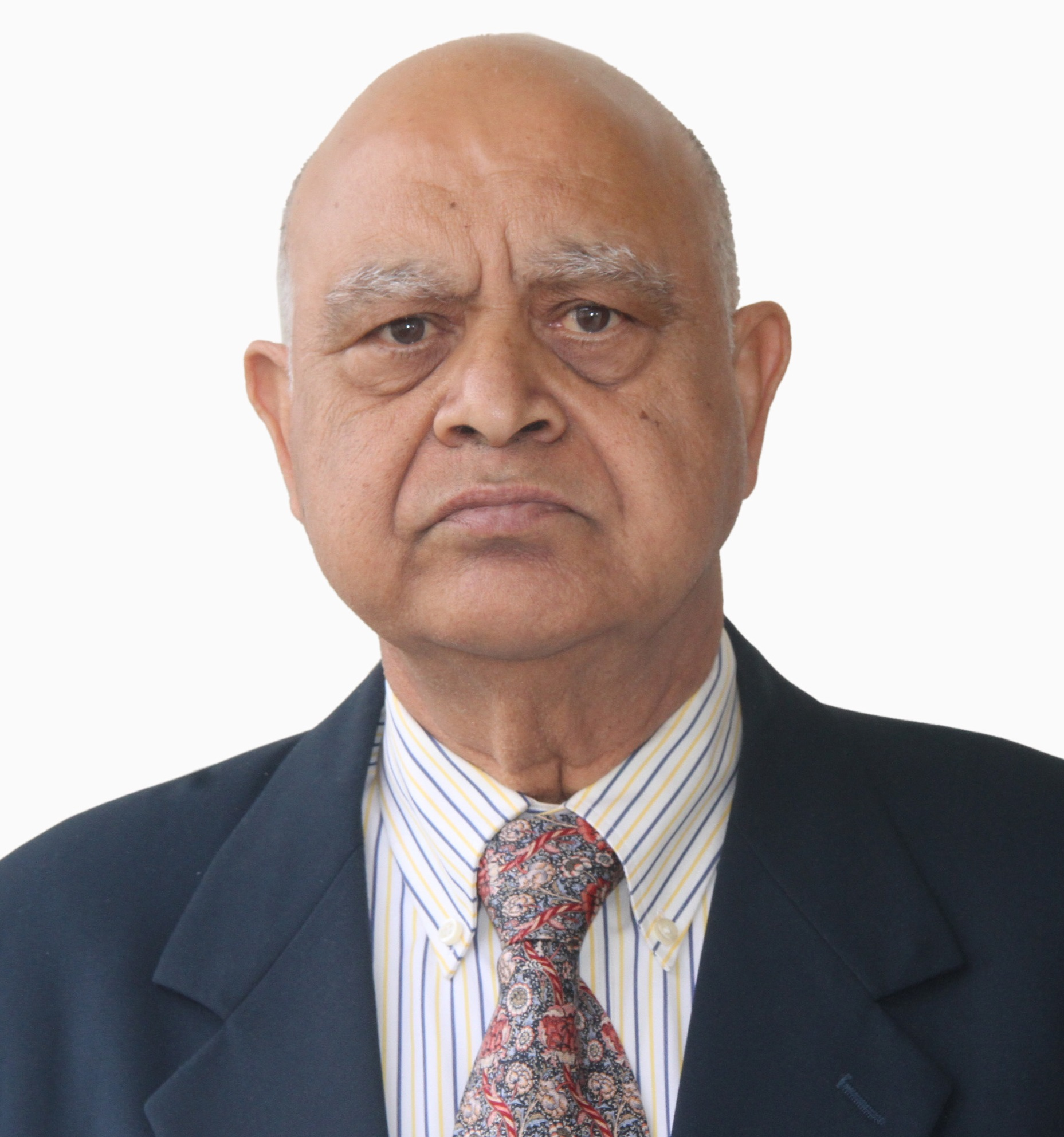
- Runchal in 2019
- Born: October 16, 1943 (age 83)
- Education: Punjab Engineering College Imperial College London
- Organization(s): Analytic & Computational Research, Inc. CFD Virtual Reality Institute
- Known for: Computational Fluid Dynamics
- Honours: ASTFE Fellowship

Akshai Runchal (born 16 October 1943) is an Indian-origin professor, entrepreneur, and pioneer in the field of Computational Fluid Dynamics (CFD) and the Finite Volume Method (FVM). He completed his Ph.D. in 1969 at Imperial College London under the mentorship of Prof. D. B. Spalding. He was a key member of the 3-person team led by Prof. D. B. Spalding that invented the Finite Volume Method (FVM) of Fluid Dynamics (CFD) in mid 1960s. He has been recognized for his contributions with an ASTFE Fellowship at Oregon State University in 2024.

== Early life and education ==
He obtained a bachelor's degree in engineering with honors from Punjab Engineering College (PEC, Chandigarh) in 1964 and obtained his Ph.D. in 1969 from Imperial College (London).

== Career ==
He started his professional career as a faculty at IIT Kanpur in 1969 and has also taught as regular or adjunct faculty at Imperial College (London), University of California (Los Angeles), Caltech (Pasadena), and California State University (Northridge). He is a Fellow of the ASME and has served as Chairman of the IIT Kanpur Foundation Board. He has been a regular member of the IIT Gandhinagar Advisory Board since 2012. He has been engaged in assisting a number of educational institutes in their R&D and Industrial Relations Programs. He is the author or co-author of 12 books and over 200 technical publications.

In 1979, Runchal established the ACRi group of companies that has offices in Los Angeles, Nice and McLeod ganj. Since the 1970s, he has provided technology and CFD Simulation services to a over 200 clients that include major corporations, R&D organizations, cities and governments in over 20 countries. He is the principal author of the ANSWER, PORFLOW, TIDAL, and RADM CFD software tools which deal with a broad spectrum of problems in fluid dynamics, heat and mass transport, and environmental pollution and are widely employed by commercial / academic and research organizations across the world. In 2011, Dr. Runchal founded a non-profit CFD Virtual Reality Institute to further the cause of CFD education, training and R&D.

He is board of Governors Kangra Arts Promotion Society, an NGO working for the promotion of arts of the greater Kangra region which comprises the current district of Kangra and surrounding areas that were once ruled by the Kangra Dynasty.
