= SIMPLE algorithm =

Computational fluid dynamics algorithm

In computational fluid dynamics (CFD), the SIMPLE algorithm is a widely used numerical procedure to solve the Navier–Stokes equations. SIMPLE is an acronym for Semi-Implicit Method for Pressure Linked Equations.

The SIMPLE algorithm was developed by Prof. Brian Spalding and his student Suhas Patankar at Imperial College London in the early 1970s. Since then it has been extensively used by many researchers to solve different kinds of fluid flow and heat transfer problems.

Many popular books on computational fluid dynamics discuss the SIMPLE algorithm in detail. A modified variant is the SIMPLER algorithm (SIMPLE Revised), that was introduced by Patankar in 1979.

== Algorithm ==
The algorithm is iterative. The basic steps in the solution update are as follows:

1. Set the boundary conditions.
2. Compute the gradients of velocity and pressure.
3. Solve the discretized momentum equation to compute the intermediate velocity field.
4. Compute the uncorrected mass fluxes at faces.
5. Solve the pressure correction equation to produce cell values of the pressure correction.
6. Update the pressure field: $p^{k + 1} = p^k + \text{urf} \cdot p^{'}$ where urf is the under-relaxation factor for pressure.
7. Update the boundary pressure corrections $p_b^{'}$.
8. Correct the face mass fluxes: $\dot m_f^{k + 1} = \dot m_f^{*} + \dot m_f^{'}$
9. Correct the cell velocities: $\vec v^{k + 1} = \vec v^{*} - \frac{{\text{Vol} \ \nabla p^{'} }}{{\vec a_P^v }}$ ; where ${\nabla p^{'} }$ is the gradient of the pressure corrections, ${\vec a_P^v }$ is the vector of central coefficients for the discretized linear system representing the velocity equation and Vol is the cell volume.
10. Update density due to pressure changes.

== See also ==
- PISO algorithm
- SIMPLEC algorithm
