= Computers & Fluids =

Scientific journal

- Discipline: Computational fluid dynamics
- Language: English
- Edited by: P. Cinnella

Publication details
- History: 1973—present
- Publisher: Elsevier
- Frequency: 17/year
- Impact factor: 3 (2025)

Standard abbreviations
- ISO 4: Comput. Fluids

Indexing
- CODEN: CPFLBI
- ISSN: 0045-7930 (print); 1879-0747 (web)

Links
- Journal homepage; Online access; Online archive

Computers & Fluids is a peer-reviewed scientific journal published by Elsevier. Established in 1973, it covers computational fluid dynamics and computational aeroacoustics, as well as numerical methods in rheology and tribology. Its current editor-in-chief is P. Cinnella (Sorbonne University).

== Abstracting and indexing ==
The journal is abstracted and indexed in:

- Current Contents/Engineering, Computing & Technology
- EBSCO databases
- Ei Compendex
- Inspec
- MathSciNet
- ProQuest databases
- Science Citation Index Expanded
- Scopus
- zbMATH

According to the Journal Citation Reports, the journal has a 2025 impact factor of 3.
