= Application of CFD in thermal power plants =

Computational fluid dynamics (CFD) are used to understand complex thermal flow regimes in power plants. The thermal power plant may be divided into different subsectors and the CFD analysis applied to critical equipment/components - mainly different types of heat exchangers - which are of crucial significance for efficient and trouble free long-term operation of the plant.

== Overview ==
The thermal power station subsystem involves multiphase flow, phase transformation and complex chemical reaction associated with conjugate heat transfer.

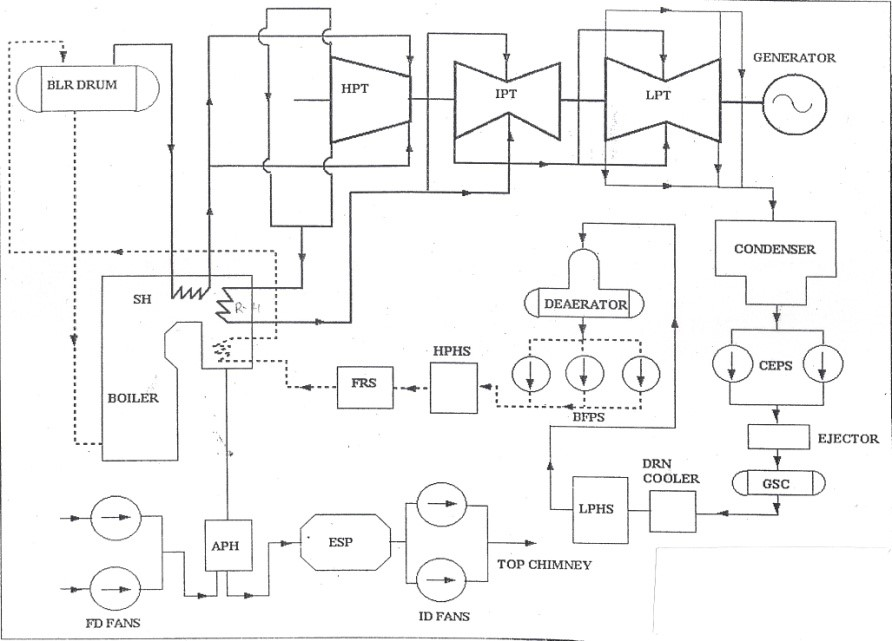
Typical layout of thermal power plant

.

== Methods ==
=== Finite difference method ===
Finite difference method describes the unknowns of the flow problem by means of point samples at the node points of a grid co-ordinate lines. Taylor series expansions are used to generate finite difference approximations of derivatives in terms of point samples at each grid point and its immediate neighbours. Those derivatives appearing in the governing equations are replaced by finite differences yielding an algebraic equation.

=== Finite element method ===
Finite element method uses piece wise functions valid on elements to describe the local variations of unknown flow variables. Here also a set of algebraic equations are generated to determine unknown co-efficients.

=== Finite volume method ===
Finite volume method is probably the most popular method used for numerical discretization in CFD. This method is similar in some ways to the finite difference method. This approach involves the discretization of the spatial domain into finite control volumes. The governing equations in their differential form are integrated over each control volume. The resulting integral conservation laws are exactly satisfied for each control volume and for the entire domain, which is a distinct advantage of the finite volume method. Each integral term is then converted into a discrete form, thus yielding discretised equations at the centroids, or nodal points, of the control volumes.

== Application of CFD in thermal power plants ==
=== Low NOx burner design ===
When fossil fuels are burned, Nitric oxide and Nitrogen dioxide are produced. These pollutants initiate reactions which result in production of ozone and acid rain. NOx formation takes place due to (1) High temperature combustion i.e. thermal NOx and (2)Nitrogen bound to fuel i.e. fuel NOx and which is insignificant. In the majority of cases the level of thermal NOx can be reduced by lowering flame temperature. This can be done by modifying the burner to create a larger (hence lower temperature) flame, in turn reducing the NOx formation. The role of CFD analysis is vital for design and analysis of such low NOx burners. Many available CFD tools, such as CFX, Fluent, Star CCM++ with different models as RNG k-ε turbulence models with hybrid and CONDIF upwind differencing schemes has been used for analysis purpose and the data obtained with these analysis helped in modifying the burner design in turn lowering the adverse effect on the environment due to NOx formation during combustion.

=== CFD analysis of economiser ===
The economiser is a crucial component for efficient performance of a thermal power plant. It is a non-steaming type of heat exchanger which is placed in the convective zone of the furnace. It takes the heat energy of the flue gases for heating the feed water before it enters the boiler drum. The thermal efficiency/boiler efficiency largely depends on the performance of the economiser. CFD analysis helps in optimizing the thermal performance of the economiser by analysing the pressure, velocity and temperature distribution, and to identify the critical areas for further improvement with the result obtained by CFD analysis.

=== CFD analysis of superheaters ===
Superheaters, which are generally placed in the radiant zone of the furnace, are used for increasing the temperature of dry saturated steam coming out from boiler drum and to maintain the required parameters before sending it to the steam turbine. The thermal efficiency of a thermal power plant depends on the performance of the superheater. The CFD analysis of superheaters is done at design stage and later at the troubleshooting and performance evaluation during the operation of the plant. The CFD results obtained can be useful for the maintenance engineer to make suitable predictions of the tube life and make suitable arrangements for the high temperature zone to reduce the erosion of the tube coil and restricting the tube leakage problem. CFD analysis consists of modelling the superheater and doing analysis to study the velocity, pressure and temperature distribution of the steam inside the superheater. The uneven temperature distribution of steam in the tube leads to boiler tube leakage. CFD also helps to study the effect of the operating parameters on the tube erosion rate. Thermal power plants operates round the year and it is not always possible to shut down and analyse the problem. CFD helps in this.

=== CFD analysis of pulverized coal combustion ===
In a thermal power plant combustion of fuel, especially pulverized coal, is of significant importance. Proper and complete combustion, with the required proportions of air and fuel, is required for total energy transfer to water for steam generation and to reduce pollutants. CFD models based on fundamental conservation equations of mass, energy, chemical species and momentum can be used to simulate the flow of air and coal through the burners. The results obtained from CFD analyses give insight to identify the potential areas for improvement.

=== CFD application in other areas of thermal power plants ===
There are some other areas of importance where CFD can play a significant role in performance and efficiency improvement. The unbalanced coal/air flow in the pipe systems of coal fired power plants leads to non-uniform combustion in the furnace, and hence an overall lower efficiency of the boiler. A common solution to this problem is to put orifices in the pipe systems to balance the flow. If the orifices are sized to balance clean airflow to individual burners connected to a pulverizer, the coal/airflow would still be unbalanced and vice versa. The CFD with standard k–e two-phase flow model can be used to calculate pressure drop coefficients for the coal/air as well as the clean air flow.

The CFD is also used to obtain the numerical solution to address the problem of water wall erosion of the furnace of a thermal power plant. This is caused by flame misalignment, thermal attack and erosion due to the contact with chemicals. The flame misalignment occurs because of alteration in fluid dynamics factors due to burner geometry. CFD results show velocity profiles, pressure profiles, streamlines and other data that is helpful in understanding the fluid flow phenomena inside the equipment. It is clearly evident from above examples how crucial is the application of CFD in addressing the bottlenecks in thermal power plants, improving power plant efficiency and assisting in maintenance decisions.
