= Multi-particle collision dynamics =

Mesoscale simulation technique

Multi-particle collision dynamics (MPC), also known as stochastic rotation dynamics (SRD), is a particle-based mesoscale simulation technique for complex fluids which fully incorporates thermal fluctuations and hydrodynamic interactions. Coupling of embedded particles to the coarse-grained solvent is achieved through molecular dynamics.

== Method of simulation ==
The solvent is modelled as a set of $N$ point particles of mass $m$ with continuous coordinates $\vec{r}_{i}$ and velocities $\vec{v}_{i}$. The simulation consists of streaming and collision steps.

During the streaming step, the coordinates of the particles are updated according to

$\vec{r}_{i}(t+\delta t_{\mathrm{MPC}}) = \vec{r}_{i}(t) + \vec{v}_{i}(t) \delta t_{\mathrm{MPC}}$

where $\delta t_{\mathrm{MPC}}$ is a chosen simulation time step which is typically much larger than a molecular dynamics time step.

After the streaming step, interactions between the solvent particles are modelled in the collision step. The particles are sorted into collision cells with a lateral size $a$. Particle velocities within each cell are updated according to the collision rule

$$\vec{v}_{i} \rightarrow \vec{v}_{\mathrm{CMS}} + \hat{\mathbf{R}} ( \vec{v}_{i} - \vec{v}_{\mathrm{CMS}} )$$

where $\vec{v}_{\mathrm{CMS}}$ is the centre of mass velocity of the particles in the collision cell and $\hat{\mathbf{R}}$ is a rotation matrix. In two dimensions, $\hat{\mathbf{R}}$ performs a rotation by an angle $+\alpha$ or $-\alpha$ with probability $1/2$. In three dimensions, the rotation is performed by an angle $\alpha$ around a random rotation axis. The same rotation is applied for all particles within a given collision cell, but the direction (axis) of rotation is statistically independent both between all cells and for a given cell in time.

If the structure of the collision grid defined by the positions of the collision cells is fixed, Galilean invariance is violated. It is restored with the introduction of a random shift of the collision grid.

Explicit expressions for the diffusion coefficient and viscosity derived based on Green-Kubo relations are in excellent agreement with simulations.

== Simulation parameters ==
The set of parameters for the simulation of the solvent are:

- solvent particle mass $m$
- average number of solvent particles per collision box $n_{s}$
- lateral collision box size $a$
- stochastic rotation angle $\alpha$
- kT (energy)
- time step $\delta t_{\mathrm{MPC}}$

The simulation parameters define the solvent properties, such as

- mean free path $\lambda = \delta t_{\mathrm{MPC}} \sqrt{kT/m}$
- diffusion coefficient $D = \frac{kT\delta t_{\mathrm MPC}}{2m} \Bigg[ \frac{d n_{s}} {(1-\cos(\alpha))(n_{s}-1+\exp^{-n_{s}})}-1 \Bigg]$
- shear viscosity $\nu$
- thermal diffusivity $D_{T}$

where $d$ is the dimensionality of the system.

A typical choice for normalisation is $a=1,\; kT=1,\;m=1$. To reproduce fluid-like behaviour, the remaining parameters may be fixed as $\alpha = 130^{o},\; n_{s} = 10,\; \delta t_{\mathrm{MPC}} \in [0.01;0.1]$.

== Applications ==
MPC has become a notable tool in the simulations of many soft-matter systems, including

- colloid dynamics
- polymer dynamics
- vesicles
- active systems
- liquid crystals
