= Piso, Kentucky =

Unincorporated community in Kentucky, United States

Piso
- Unincorporated community
- Location within the state of Kentucky Piso (the United States)
- Coordinates: 37°38′9″N 82°28′3″W
- Country: United States
- State: Kentucky
- County: Pike
- Elevation: 801 ft (244 m)
- Time zone: UTC-5 (Eastern (EST))
  - Summer (DST): UTC-4 (EDT)
- GNIS feature ID: 508829

Piso is an unincorporated community located in Pike County, Kentucky, United States. Their post office has been closed. The community was named by Bud Williamson after viewing an advertisement for medicine in an almanac.
