= Detached eddy simulation =

Model in fluid dynamics

Detached eddy simulation (DES) is a modification of a Reynolds-averaged Navier–Stokes equations (RANS) model in which the model switches to a subgrid scale formulation in regions fine enough for large eddy simulation (LES) calculations.

== Details ==
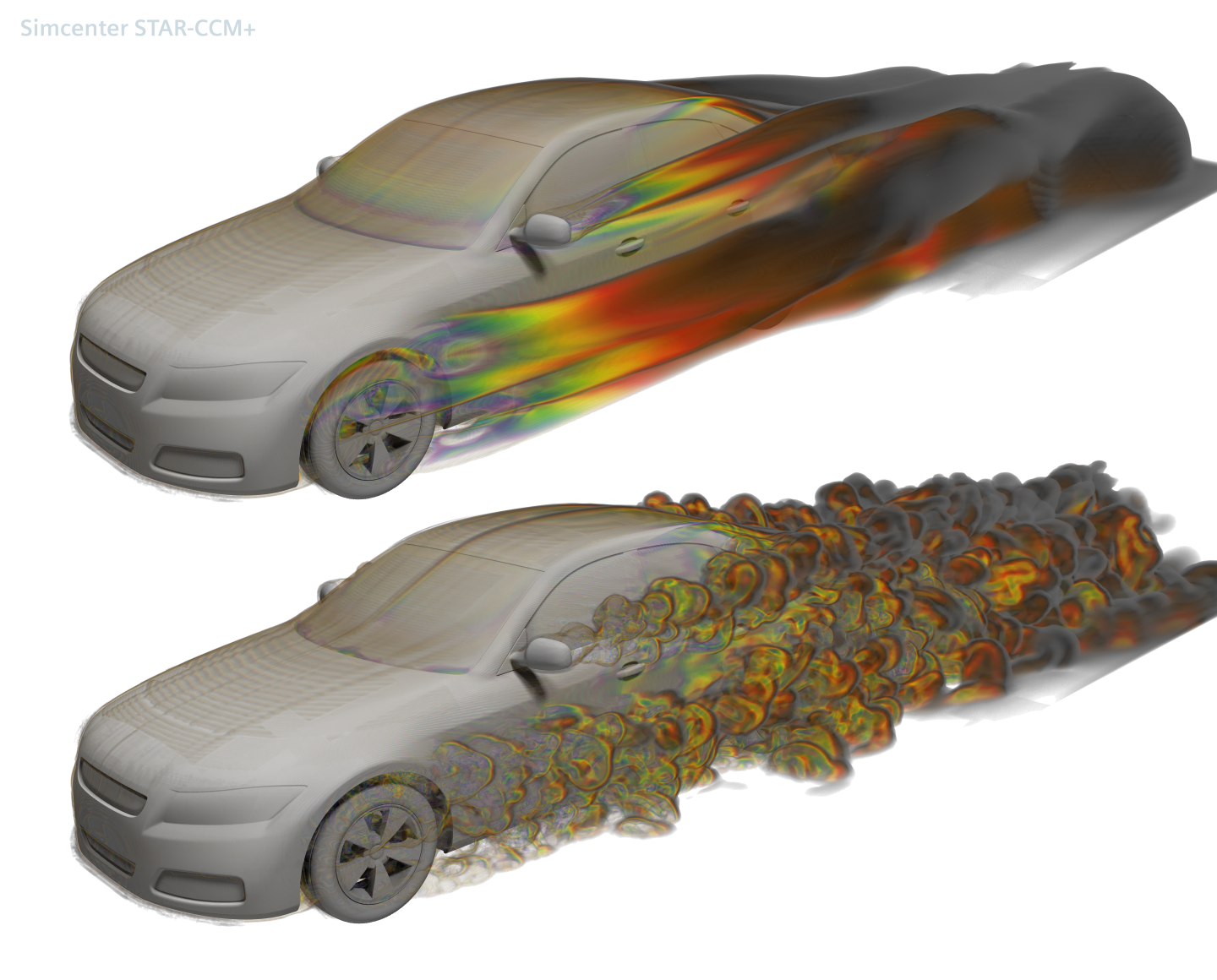
External aerodynamics of the DrivAer model, computed using URANS (top) and DDES (bottom)

Regions near solid boundaries and where the turbulent length scale is less than the maximum grid dimension are assigned the RANS mode of solution. As the turbulent length scale exceeds the grid dimension, the regions are solved using the LES mode. Therefore, the grid resolution is not as demanding as pure LES, thereby considerably cutting down the cost of the computation. Though DES was initially formulated for the Spalart-Allmaras model, it can be implemented with other RANS models (Strelets, 2001), by appropriately modifying the length scale which is explicitly or implicitly involved in the RANS model. So while Spalart-Allmaras model based DES acts as LES with a wall model, DES based on other models (like two equation models) behave as a hybrid RANS-LES model. Grid generation is more complicated than for a simple RANS or LES case due to the RANS-LES switch. DES is a non-zonal approach and provides a single smooth velocity field across the RANS and the LES regions of the solution.
