= Brian Launder =

British academic

Professor Brian Launder FRS FREng

Research Professor of Mechanical Engineering, UMIST/University of Manchester
- In office 1998–2022

Personal details
- Born: Brian Edward Launder; 20 July 1939 (age 87)

Brian Edward Launder (born 20 July 1939) is a Professor of Mechanical Engineering at the University of Manchester, United Kingdom. He is known for his work in the field of turbulent flows in general and turbulence modelling in particular. In 1994, he became a Fellow of the Royal Society.

== Education and career ==
Launder received a bachelor's degree in mechanical engineering from Imperial College, London where he came first in the class and won the Bramwell Medal. He then joined Massachusetts Institute of Technology for his master's degree and went on to take a doctoral degree for experimental work on boundary layers. After completion the Sc.D., Launder returned to Imperial College in 1964 to join the faculty as lecturer and later became the Reader in Fluid Mechanics. After serving at Imperial College for 12 years, Launder went to the University of California, Davis in 1976 where he served as Professor of Mechanical Engineering for four years. In 1980, he returned to the UK and joined University of Manchester Institute of Science and Technology as the head of the Thermo-Fluids Division. a position he discharged for 16 years as well as two terms as Head of Department

== Work and recognition ==
Launder's main focus of research is the turbulence modelling for computational fluid dynamics. The $k$-$\epsilon$ model introduced by W. P. Jones and Launder is considered to be the most popular $k$-$\epsilon$ model in the turbulence modelling community. They introduced this model in the 1972 paper titled "The prediction of laminarization with a two-equation model of turbulence" and is often referred to as the Standard $k$-$\epsilon$ model. Launder also developed, along with his co-workers Gordon J. Reece and Wolfgang Rodi, a second order closure model, known as Launder–Reece–Rodi model (1975), which became one of the most thoroughly tested turbulence models.

In recognition of his contribution to turbulence modelling, Launder has been admitted as a Fellow of the Royal Society and the Royal Academy of Engineering. He has also received many international honours including honorary degrees from three European universities. Between 2000 and 2006, he served as the Regional Director of the Tyndall Centre for Climate Change Research.

== Selected books ==
- B. E. Launder and D. B. Spalding, Mathematical Models of Turbulence, Academic Press (1972).
- B. E. Launder and N. D. Sandham, Closure Strategies for Turbulent and Transitional Flows, Cambridge University Press (2002).
- Brian Launder and J. Michael T. Thompson: Geo-engineering climate change. Environmental necessity or Pandora's box?. Cambridge University Press. Cambridge 2010. ISBN 978-0-521-19803-5
- Kemal Hanjalic and Brian Launder: Modelling turbulence in engineering and the environment. Second-moment routes to closure. Cambridge University Press. Cambridge 2011.ISBN 978-0-521-84575-5
