= Computational fluid dynamics =

Analysis and solving of problems that involve fluid flows

Computational fluid dynamics (CFD) is a branch of both fluid mechanics and computational physics that uses numerical analysis and data structures to analyze and solve problems that involve flows. Computers are used to perform the calculations required to simulate the free-stream flow of the fluid, and the interaction of the fluid (liquids and gases) with surfaces defined by boundary conditions. With high-speed supercomputers, better solutions can be achieved, and are often required to solve the largest and most complex problems. Ongoing research yields software that improves the accuracy and speed of complex simulation scenarios such as transonic or turbulent flows. Initial validation of such software is typically performed using experimental apparatus such as wind tunnels. In addition, previously performed analytical or empirical analysis of a particular problem can be used for comparison. A final validation is often performed using full-scale testing, such as flight tests.

Computational biofluid dynamics is a specialization of computational fluid dynamics in which computer science is used to study the mechanics of biological fluids such as blood (hemodynamics), urine (urodynamics), and oxygen (respiration) in humans and other living beings. Another specialization is computational aerodynamics, which is focused around aerodynamics.

CFD is applied to a range of research and engineering problems in multiple fields of study and industries, including aerodynamics and aerospace analysis, hypersonics, weather simulation, natural science and environmental engineering, industrial system design and analysis, biological engineering, fluid flows and heat transfer, engine and combustion analysis, and visual effects for film and games.

== Evolution and Development ==
Karman vortex animation

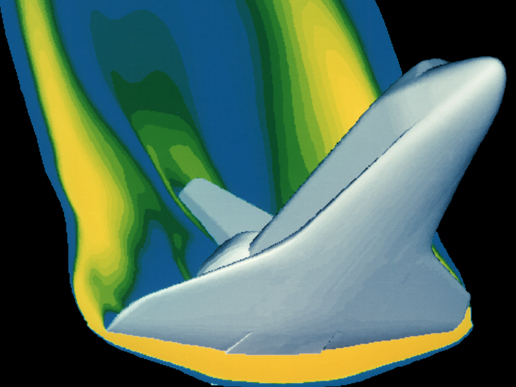
A computer simulation of high velocity air flow around the Space Shuttle during re-entry

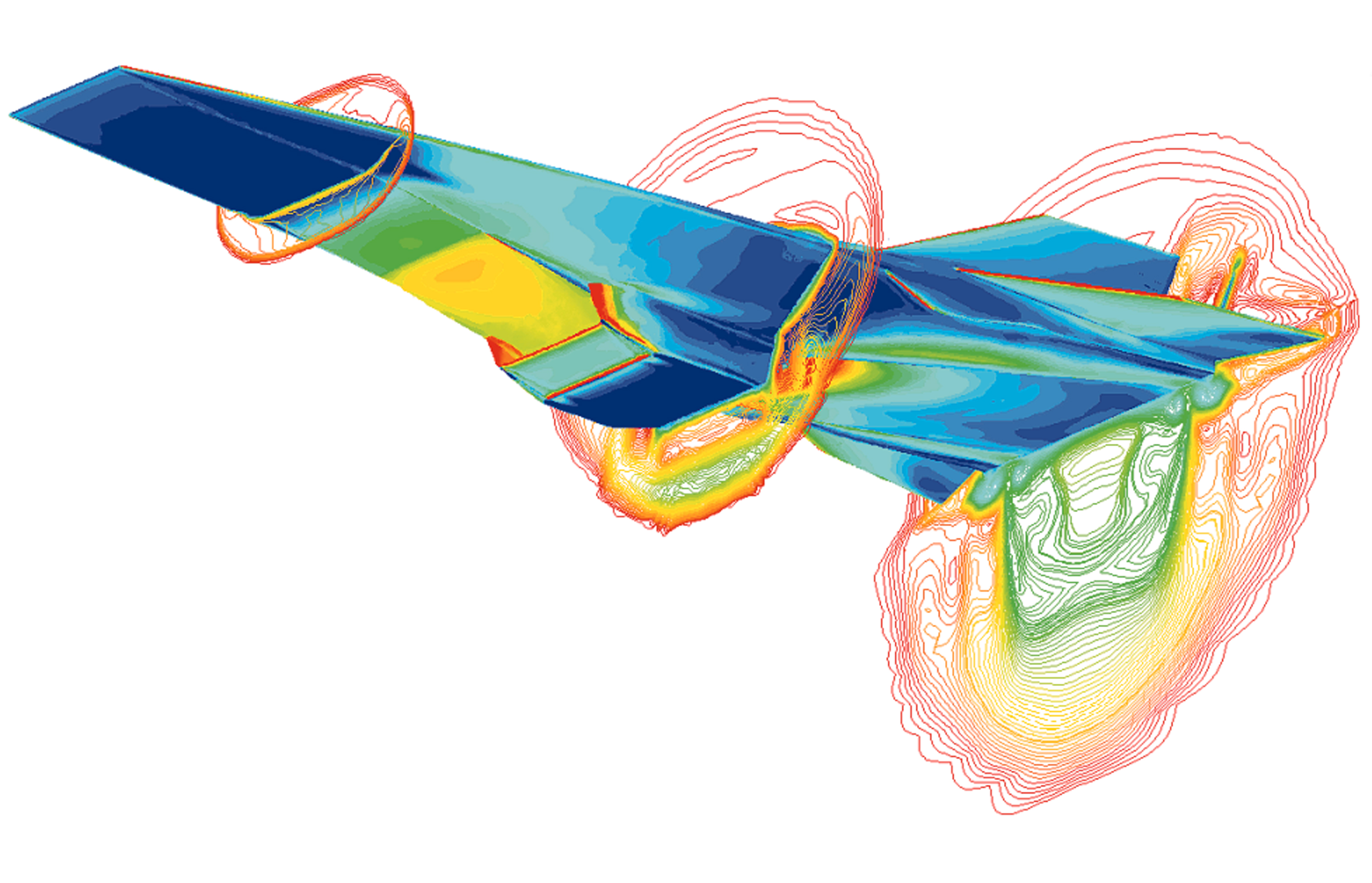
A simulation of the Hyper-X scramjet vehicle in operation at Mach-7

The fundamental basis of almost all CFD problems is the Navier–Stokes equations, which define a number of single-phase (gas or liquid, but not both) fluid flows. These equations can be simplified by removing terms describing viscous actions to yield the Euler equations. Further simplification, by removing terms describing vorticity yields the full potential equations. Finally, for small perturbations in subsonic and supersonic flows (not transonic or hypersonic) these equations can be linearized to yield the linearized potential equations.

Historically, methods were first developed to solve the linearized potential equations. Two-dimensional (2D) methods, using conformal transformations of the flow about a cylinder to the flow about an airfoil were developed in the 1930s.

One of the earliest type of calculations resembling modern CFD are those by Lewis Fry Richardson, in the sense that these calculations used finite differences and divided the physical space in cells. Although they failed dramatically, these calculations, together with Richardson's book Weather Prediction by Numerical Process, set the basis for modern CFD and numerical meteorology. In fact, early CFD calculations during the 1940s using ENIAC used methods close to those in Richardson's 1922 book.

The computer power available paced development of three-dimensional methods. Probably the first work using computers to model fluid flow, as governed by the Navier–Stokes equations, was performed at Los Alamos National Lab, in the T3 group. This group was led by Francis H. Harlow, who is widely considered one of the pioneers of CFD. From 1957 to late 1960s, this group developed a variety of numerical methods to simulate transient two-dimensional fluid flows, such as particle-in-cell method, fluid-in-cell method, vorticity stream function method, and marker-and-cell method. Fromm's vorticity-stream-function method for 2D, transient, incompressible flow was the first treatment of strongly contorting incompressible flows in the world.

The first paper with three-dimensional model was published by John Hess and A.M.O. Smith of Douglas Aircraft in 1967. This method discretized the surface of the geometry with panels, giving rise to this class of programs being called Panel Methods. Their method itself was simplified, in that it did not include lifting flows and hence was mainly applied to ship hulls and aircraft fuselages. The first lifting Panel Code (A230) was described in a paper written by Paul Rubbert and Gary Saaris of Boeing Aircraft in 1968. In time, more advanced three-dimensional Panel Codes were developed at Boeing (PANAIR, A502), Lockheed (Quadpan), Douglas (HESS), McDonnell Aircraft (MACAERO), NASA (PMARC) and Analytical Methods (WBAERO, USAERO and VSAERO). Some (PANAIR, HESS and MACAERO) were higher order codes, using higher order distributions of surface singularities, while others (Quadpan, PMARC, USAERO and VSAERO) used single singularities on each surface panel. The advantage of the lower order codes was that they ran much faster on the computers of the time. Today, VSAERO has grown to be a multi-order code and is the most widely used program of this class. It has been used in the development of a number of submarines, surface ships, automobiles, helicopters, aircraft, and more recently wind turbines. Its sister code, USAERO is an unsteady panel method that has also been used for modeling such things as high speed trains and racing yachts. The NASA PMARC code from an early version of VSAERO and a derivative of PMARC, named CMARC, is also commercially available.

In the two-dimensional realm, a number of Panel Codes have been developed for airfoil analysis and design. The codes typically have a boundary layer analysis included, so that viscous effects can be modeled. Richard Eppler developed the PROFILE code, partly with NASA funding, which became available in the early 1980s. This was soon followed by Mark Drela's XFOIL code. Both PROFILE and XFOIL incorporate two-dimensional panel codes, with coupled boundary layer codes for airfoil analysis work. PROFILE uses a conformal transformation method for inverse airfoil design, while XFOIL has both a conformal transformation and an inverse panel method for airfoil design.

An intermediate step between Panel Codes and Full Potential codes were codes that used the Transonic Small Disturbance equations. In particular, the three-dimensional WIBCO code, developed by Charlie Boppe of Grumman Aircraft in the early 1980s has seen heavy use.

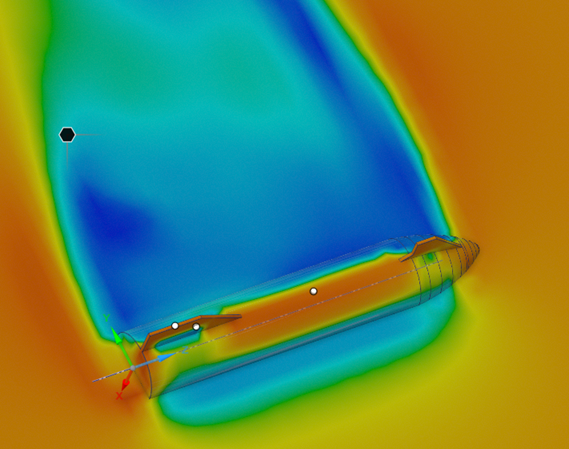
A simulation of the SpaceX Starship during re-entry

Developers turned to Full Potential codes, as panel methods could not calculate the non-linear flow present at transonic speeds. The first description of a means of using the Full Potential equations was published by Earll Murman and Julian Cole of Boeing in 1970. Frances Bauer, Paul Garabedian and David Korn of the Courant Institute at New York University (NYU) wrote a series of two-dimensional Full Potential airfoil codes that were widely used, the most important being named Program H. A further growth of Program H was developed by Bob Melnik and his group at Grumman Aerospace as Grumfoil. Antony Jameson, originally at Grumman Aircraft and the Courant Institute of NYU, worked with David Caughey to develop the important three-dimensional Full Potential code FLO22 in 1975. A number of Full Potential codes emerged after this, culminating in Boeing's Tranair (A633) code, which still sees heavy use.

The next step was the Euler equations, which promised to provide more accurate solutions of transonic flows. The methodology used by Jameson in his three-dimensional FLO57 code (1981) was used by others to produce such programs as Lockheed's TEAM program and IAI/Analytical Methods' MGAERO program. MGAERO is unique in being a structured cartesian mesh code, while most other such codes use structured body-fitted grids (with the exception of NASA's highly successful CART3D code, Lockheed's SPLITFLOW code and Georgia Tech's NASCART-GT). Antony Jameson also developed the three-dimensional AIRPLANE code which made use of unstructured tetrahedral grids.

In the two-dimensional realm, Mark Drela and Michael Giles, then graduate students at MIT, developed the ISES Euler program (actually a suite of programs) for airfoil design and analysis. This code first became available in 1986 and has been further developed to design, analyze and optimize single or multi-element airfoils, as the MSES program. MSES sees wide use throughout the world. A derivative of MSES, for the design and analysis of airfoils in a cascade, is MISES, developed by Harold Youngren while he was a graduate student at MIT.

The Navier–Stokes equations were the ultimate target of development. Two-dimensional codes, such as NASA Ames' ARC2D code first emerged. A number of three-dimensional codes were developed (ARC3D, OVERFLOW, CFL3D are three successful NASA contributions), leading to numerous commercial packages.

== Hierarchy of Flow Equations and Physical Assumptions ==
CFD can be seen as a group of computational methodologies (discussed below) used to solve equations governing fluid flow. In the application of CFD, a critical step is to decide which set of physical assumptions and related equations need to be used for the problem at hand. To illustrate this step, the following summarizes the physical assumptions/simplifications taken in equations of a flow that is single-phase (see multiphase flow and two-phase flow), single-species (i.e., it consists of one chemical species), non-reacting, and (unless said otherwise) compressible. Thermal radiation is neglected, and body forces due to gravity are considered (unless said otherwise). In addition, for this type of flow, the next discussion highlights the hierarchy of flow equations solved with CFD. Note that some of the following equations could be derived in more than one way.

- Conservation laws (CL): These are the most fundamental equations considered with CFD in the sense that, for example, all the following equations can be derived from them. For a single-phase, single-species, compressible flow one considers the conservation of mass, conservation of linear momentum, and conservation of energy.
- Continuum conservation laws (CCL): Start with the CL. Assume that mass, momentum and energy are locally conserved: These quantities are conserved and cannot "teleport" from one place to another but can only move by a continuous flow (see continuity equation). Another interpretation is that one starts with the CL and assumes a continuum medium (see continuum mechanics). The resulting system of equations is unclosed since to solve it one needs further relationships/equations: (a) constitutive relationships for the viscous stress tensor; (b) constitutive relationships for the diffusive heat flux; (c) an equation of state (EOS), such as the ideal gas law; and, (d) a caloric equation of state relating temperature with quantities such as enthalpy or internal energy.
- Compressible Navier-Stokes equations (C-NS): Start with the CCL. Assume a Newtonian viscous stress tensor (see Newtonian fluid) and a Fourier heat flux (see heat flux). The C-NS need to be augmented with an EOS and a caloric EOS to have a closed system of equations.
- Incompressible Navier-Stokes equations (I-NS): Start with the C-NS. Assume that density is always and everywhere constant. Another way to obtain the I-NS is to assume that the Mach number is very small and that temperature differences in the fluid are very small as well. As a result, the mass-conservation and momentum-conservation equations are decoupled from the energy-conservation equation, so one only needs to solve for the first two equations.
- Compressible Euler equations (EE): Start with the C-NS. Assume a frictionless flow with no diffusive heat flux.
- Weakly compressible Navier-Stokes equations (WC-NS): Start with the C-NS. Assume that density variations depend only on temperature and not on pressure. For example, for an ideal gas, use $\rho = p_0 / (R T)$, where $p_0$ is a conveniently defined reference pressure that is always and everywhere constant, $\rho$ is density, $R$ is the specific gas constant, and $T$ is temperature. As a result, the WC-NS do not capture acoustic waves. It is also common in the WC-NS to neglect the pressure-work and viscous-heating terms in the energy-conservation equation. The WC-NS are also called the C-NS with the low-Mach-number approximation.
- Boussinesq equations: Start with the C-NS. Assume that density variations are always and everywhere negligible except in the gravity term of the momentum-conservation equation (where density multiplies the gravitational acceleration). Also assume that various fluid properties such as viscosity, thermal conductivity, and heat capacity are always and everywhere constant. The Boussinesq equations are widely used in microscale meteorology.
- Compressible Reynolds-averaged Navier–Stokes equations and compressible Favre-averaged Navier-Stokes equations (C-RANS and C-FANS): Start with the C-NS. Assume that any flow variable $f$, such as density, velocity and pressure, can be represented as $f = F + f''$, where $F$ is the ensemble-average of any flow variable, and $f''$ is a perturbation or fluctuation from this average. $f''$ is not necessarily small. If $F$ is a classic ensemble-average (see Reynolds decomposition) one obtains the Reynolds-averaged Navier–Stokes equations. And if $F$ is a density-weighted ensemble-average one obtains the Favre-averaged Navier-Stokes equations. As a result, and depending on the Reynolds number, the range of scales of motion is greatly reduced, something which leads to much faster solutions in comparison to solving the C-NS. However, information is lost, and the resulting system of equations requires the closure of various unclosed terms, notably the Reynolds stress.
- Ideal flow or potential flow equations: Start with the EE. Assume zero fluid-particle rotation (zero vorticity) and zero flow expansion (zero divergence). The resulting flowfield is entirely determined by the geometrical boundaries. Ideal flows can be useful in modern CFD to initialize simulations.
- Linearized compressible Euler equations (LEE): Start with the EE. Assume that any flow variable $f$, such as density, velocity and pressure, can be represented as $f = f_0 + f'$, where $f_0$ is the value of the flow variable at some reference or base state, and $f'$ is a perturbation or fluctuation from this state. Furthermore, assume that this perturbation $f'$ is very small in comparison with some reference value. Finally, assume that $f_0$ satisfies "its own" equation, such as the EE. The LEE and its multiple variations are widely used in computational aeroacoustics.
- Sound wave or acoustic wave equation: Start with the LEE. Neglect all gradients of $f_0$ and $f'$, and assume that the Mach number at the reference or base state is very small. The resulting equations for density, momentum and energy can be manipulated into a pressure equation, giving the well-known sound wave equation.
- Shallow water equations (SW): Consider a flow near a wall where the wall-parallel length-scale of interest is much larger than the wall-normal length-scale of interest. Start with the EE. Assume that density is always and everywhere constant, neglect the velocity component perpendicular to the wall, and consider the velocity parallel to the wall to be spatially-constant.
- Boundary layer equations (BL): Start with the C-NS (I-NS) for compressible (incompressible) boundary layers. Assume that there are thin regions next to walls where spatial gradients perpendicular to the wall are much larger than those parallel to the wall.
- Bernoulli equation: Start with the EE. Assume that density variations depend only on pressure variations. See Bernoulli's Principle.
- Steady Bernoulli equation: Start with the Bernoulli Equation and assume a steady flow. Or start with the EE and assume that the flow is steady and integrate the resulting equation along a streamline.
- Stokes Flow or creeping flow equations: Start with the C-NS or I-NS. Neglect the inertia of the flow. Such an assumption can be justified when the Reynolds number is very low. As a result, the resulting set of equations is linear, something which simplifies greatly their solution.
- Two-dimensional channel flow equation: Consider the flow between two infinite parallel plates. Start with the C-NS. Assume that the flow is steady, two-dimensional, and fully developed (i.e., the velocity profile does not change along the streamwise direction). Note that this widely used, fully developed assumption can be inadequate in some instances, such as some compressible, microchannel flows, in which case it can be supplanted by a locally fully developed assumption.
- One-dimensional Euler equations or one-dimensional gas-dynamic equations (1D-EE): Start with the EE. Assume that all flow quantities depend only on one spatial dimension.
- Fanno flow equation: Consider the flow inside a duct with constant area and adiabatic walls. Start with the 1D-EE. Assume a steady flow, no gravity effects, and introduce in the momentum-conservation equation an empirical term to recover the effect of wall friction (neglected in the EE). To close the Fanno flow equation, a model for this friction term is needed. Such a closure involves problem-dependent assumptions.
- Rayleigh flow equation. Consider the flow inside a duct with constant area and either non-adiabatic walls without volumetric heat sources or adiabatic walls with volumetric heat sources. Start with the 1D-EE. Assume a steady flow, no gravity effects, and introduce in the energy-conservation equation an empirical term to recover the effect of wall heat transfer or the effect of the heat sources (neglected in the EE).

== Methodology ==
In all of these approaches the same basic procedure is followed.

- During preprocessing
  - The geometry and physical bounds of the problem can be defined using computer aided design (CAD). From there, data can be suitably processed (cleaned-up) and the fluid volume (or fluid domain) is extracted.
  - The volume occupied by the fluid is divided into discrete cells (the mesh). The mesh may be uniform or non-uniform, structured or unstructured, consisting of a combination of hexahedral, tetrahedral, prismatic, pyramidal or polyhedral elements.
  - The physical modeling is defined – for example, the equations of fluid motion + enthalpy + radiation + species conservation
  - Boundary conditions are defined. This involves specifying the fluid behaviour and properties at all bounding surfaces of the fluid domain. For transient problems, the initial conditions are also defined.
- The simulation is started and the equations are solved iteratively as a steady-state or transient.
- Finally a postprocessor is used for the analysis and visualization of the resulting solution.

Exact solutions such as the two-dimensional Taylor–Green vortex, and well-known benchmark test cases such as the lid-driven cavity, provide benchmarks for numerical solvers, allowing computed results to be compared with known solutions to test for accuracy.

=== Discretization methods ===
The stability of the selected discretisation is generally established numerically rather than analytically as with simple linear problems. Special care must also be taken to ensure that the discretisation handles discontinuous solutions gracefully. The Euler equations and Navier–Stokes equations both admit shocks and contact surfaces.

Some of the discretization methods being used are:

==== Finite volume method ====
The finite volume method (FVM) is a common approach used in CFD codes, as it has an advantage in memory usage and solution speed, especially for large problems, high Reynolds number turbulent flows, and source term dominated flows (like combustion).

In the finite volume method, the governing partial differential equations (typically the Navier-Stokes equations, the mass and energy conservation equations, and the turbulence equations) are recast in a conservative form, and then solved over discrete control volumes. This discretization guarantees the conservation of fluxes through a particular control volume. The finite volume equation yields governing equations in the form,

$$\frac{\partial}{\partial t}\iiint Q\, dV + \iint F\, d\mathbf{A} = 0,$$

where $Q$ is the vector of conserved variables, $F$ is the vector of fluxes (see Euler equations or Navier–Stokes equations), $V$ is the volume of the control volume element, and $\mathbf{A}$ is the surface area of the control volume element.

==== Finite element method ====
The finite element method (FEM) is used in structural analysis of solids, but is also applicable to fluids. However, the FEM formulation requires special care to ensure a conservative solution. The FEM formulation has been adapted for use with fluid dynamics governing equations. Although FEM must be carefully formulated to be conservative, it is much more stable than the finite volume approach. FEM also provides more accurate solutions for smooth problems comparing to FVM. Another advantage of FEM is that it can handle complex geometries and boundary conditions. However, FEM can require more memory and has slower solution times than the FVM.

In this method, a weighted residual equation is formed:

$$R_i = \iiint W_i Q \, dV^e$$

where $R_i$ is the equation residual at an element vertex $i$, $Q$ is the conservation equation expressed on an element basis, $W_i$ is the weight factor, and $V^{e}$ is the volume of the element.

==== Finite difference method ====
The finite difference method (FDM) has historical importance and is simple to program. It is currently only used in few specialized codes, which handle complex geometry with high accuracy and efficiency by using embedded boundaries or overlapping grids (with the solution interpolated across each grid).

$$\frac{\partial Q}{\partial t}+
\frac{\partial F}{\partial x}+
\frac{\partial G}{\partial y}+
\frac{\partial H}{\partial z}=0$$

where $Q$ is the vector of conserved variables, and $F$, $G$, and $H$ are the fluxes in the $x$, $y$, and $z$ directions respectively.

==== Spectral element method ====
Spectral element method is a finite element type method. It requires the mathematical problem (the partial differential equation) to be cast in a weak formulation. This is typically done by multiplying the differential equation by an arbitrary test function and integrating over the whole domain. Purely mathematically, the test functions are completely arbitrary - they belong to an infinite-dimensional function space. Clearly an infinite-dimensional function space cannot be represented on a discrete spectral element mesh; this is where the spectral element discretization begins. The most crucial thing is the choice of interpolating and testing functions. In a standard, low order FEM in 2D, for quadrilateral elements the most typical choice is the bilinear test or interpolating function of the form $v(x,y) = ax+by+cxy+d$. In a spectral element method however, the interpolating and test functions are chosen to be polynomials of a very high order (typically e.g. of the 10th order in CFD applications). This guarantees the rapid convergence of the method. Furthermore, very efficient integration procedures must be used, since the number of integrations to be performed in numerical codes is big. Thus, high order Gauss integration quadratures are employed, since they achieve the highest accuracy with the smallest number of computations to be carried out. At the time there are some academic CFD codes based on the spectral element method and some more are currently under development, since the new time-stepping schemes arise in the scientific world.

==== Lattice Boltzmann method ====
The lattice Boltzmann method (LBM) with its simplified kinetic picture on a lattice provides a computationally efficient description of hydrodynamics. Unlike the traditional CFD methods, which solve the conservation equations of macroscopic properties (i.e., mass, momentum, and energy) numerically, LBM models the fluid consisting of fictive particles, and such particles perform consecutive propagation and collision processes over a discrete lattice mesh. In this method, one works with the discrete in space and time version of the kinetic evolution equation in the Boltzmann Bhatnagar-Gross-Krook (BGK) form.

==== Vortex method ====
The vortex method, also Lagrangian Vortex Particle Method, is a meshfree technique for the simulation of incompressible turbulent flows. In it, vorticity is discretized onto Lagrangian particles, these computational elements being called vortices, vortons, or vortex particles. Vortex methods were developed as a grid-free methodology that would not be limited by the fundamental smoothing effects associated with grid-based methods. To be practical, however, vortex methods require means for rapidly computing velocities from the vortex elements – in other words they require the solution to a particular form of the N-body problem (in which the motion of N objects is tied to their mutual influences). This breakthrough came in the 1980s with the development of the Barnes-Hut and fast multipole method (FMM) algorithms. These paved the way to practical computation of the velocities from the vortex elements.

Software based on the vortex method offer a means for solving fluid dynamics problems with minimal user intervention, only requiring specification of problem geometry and setting of boundary and initial conditions. Advantages of this method include;

- It is practically grid-free, thus eliminating numerous iterations associated with RANS and LES.
- All problems are treated identically. No modeling or calibration inputs are required.
- Time-series simulations, which are crucial for correct analysis of acoustics, are possible.
- The small scale and large scale are accurately simulated at the same time.

==== Boundary element method ====
In the boundary element method, the boundary occupied by the fluid is divided into a surface mesh.

==== High-resolution discretization schemes ====
High-resolution schemes are used where shocks or discontinuities are present. Capturing sharp changes in the solution requires the use of second or higher-order numerical schemes that do not introduce spurious oscillations. This usually necessitates the application of flux limiters to ensure that the solution is total variation diminishing.

=== Turbulence models ===
In computational modeling of turbulent flows, one common objective is to obtain a model that can predict quantities of interest, such as fluid velocity, for use in engineering designs of the system being modeled. For turbulent flows, the range of length scales and complexity of phenomena involved in turbulence make most modeling approaches prohibitively expensive; the resolution required to resolve all scales involved in turbulence is beyond what is computationally possible. The primary approach in such cases is to create numerical models to approximate unresolved phenomena. This section lists some commonly used computational models for turbulent flows.

Turbulence models can be classified based on computational expense, which corresponds to the range of scales that are modeled versus resolved (the more turbulent scales that are resolved, the finer the resolution of the simulation, and therefore the higher the computational cost). If a majority or all of the turbulent scales are not modeled, the computational cost is very low, but the tradeoff comes in the form of decreased accuracy.

In addition to the wide range of length and time scales and the associated computational cost, the governing equations of fluid dynamics contain a non-linear convection term and a non-linear and non-local pressure gradient term. These nonlinear equations must be solved numerically with the appropriate boundary and initial conditions.

==== Reynolds-averaged Navier–Stokes ====
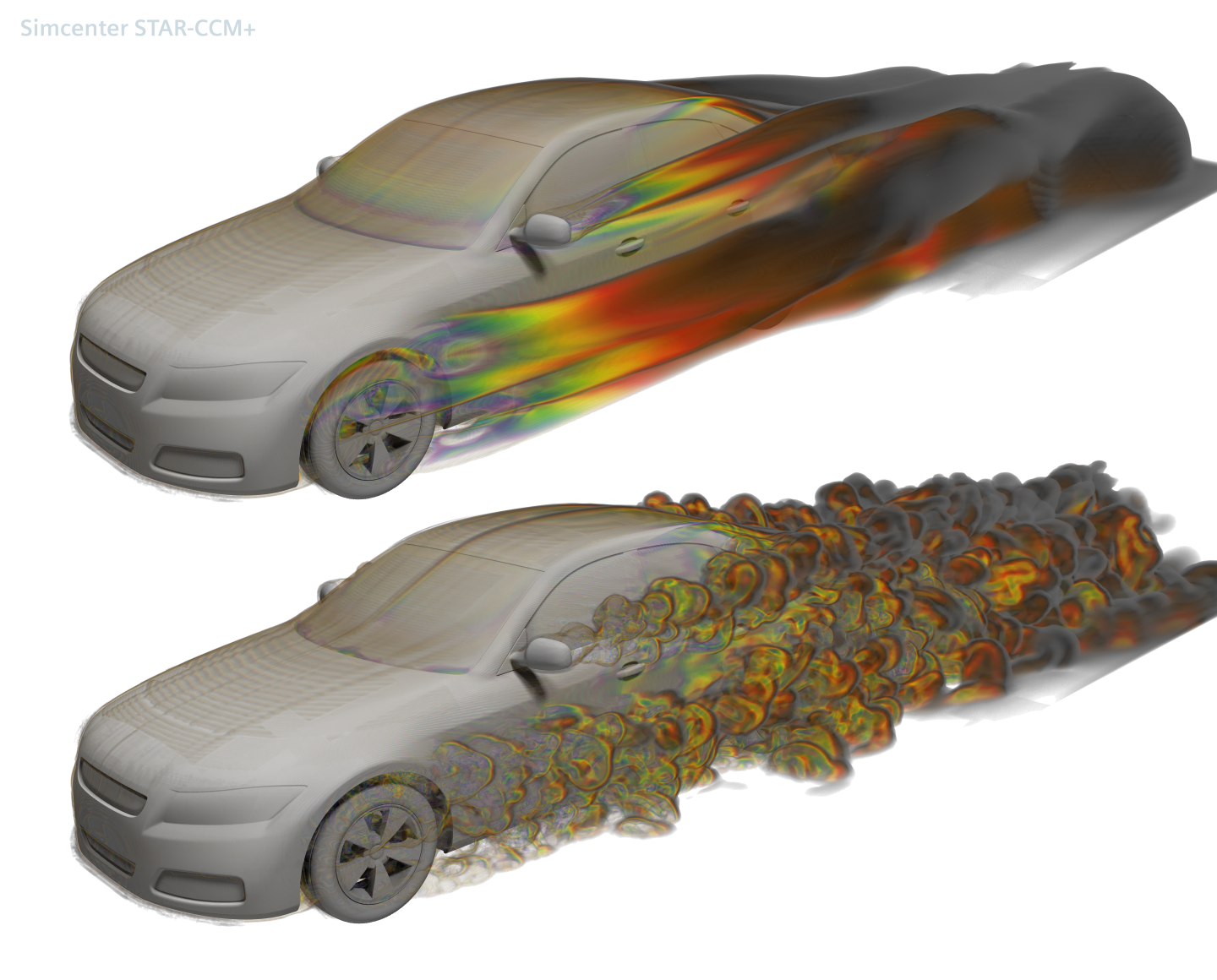
External aerodynamics of the DrivAer model, computed using URANS (top) and DDES (bottom)

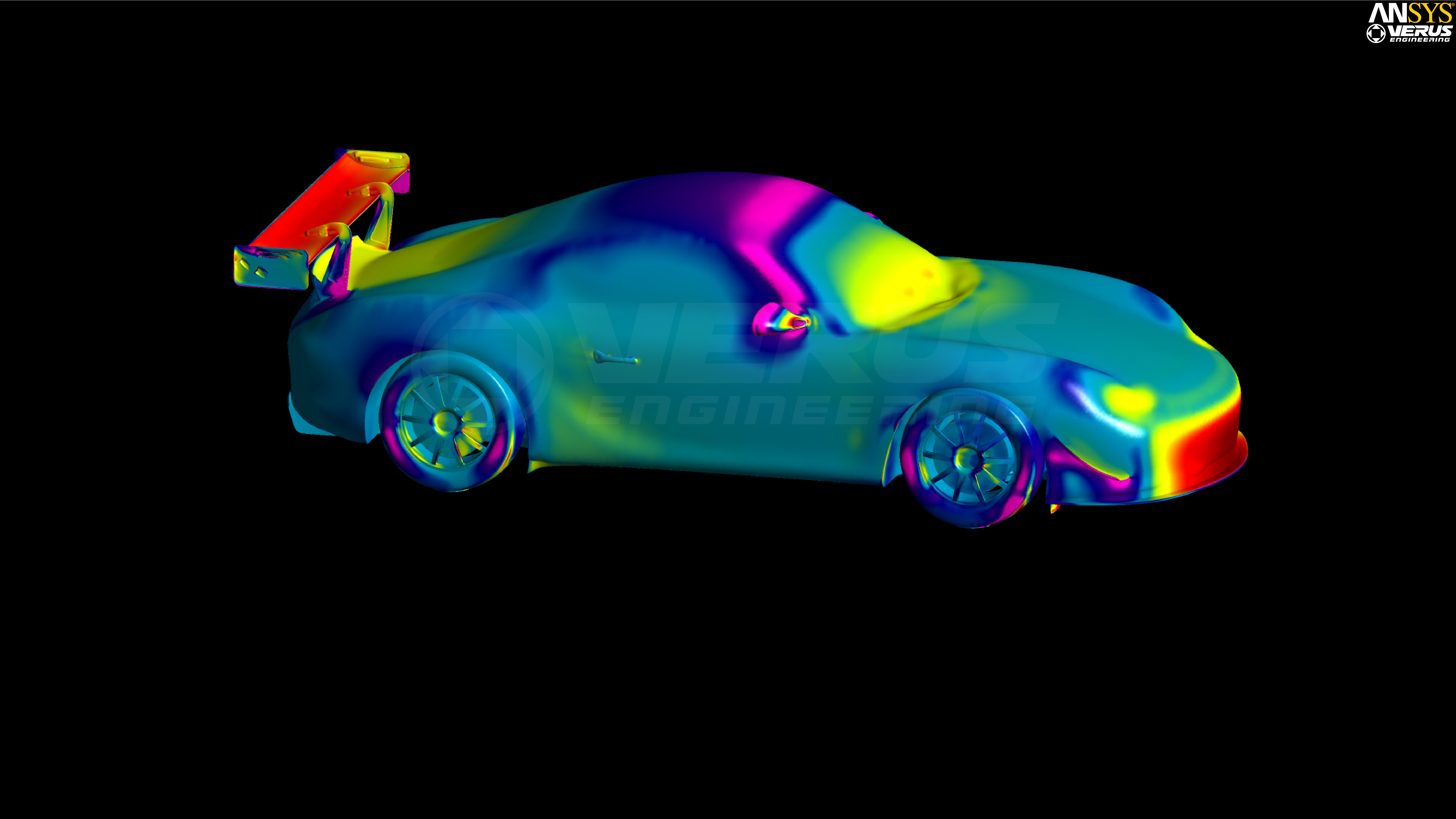
A simulation of aerodynamic package of a Porsche Cayman (987.2)

Reynolds-averaged Navier–Stokes (RANS) equations are the oldest approach to turbulence modeling. An ensemble version of the governing equations is solved, which introduces new apparent stresses known as Reynolds stresses. This adds a second-order tensor of unknowns for which various models can provide different levels of closure. It is a common misconception that the RANS equations do not apply to flows with a time-varying mean flow because these equations are 'time-averaged'. In fact, statistically unsteady (or non-stationary) flows can equally be treated. This is sometimes referred to as URANS. There is nothing inherent in Reynolds averaging to preclude this, but the turbulence models used to close the equations are valid only as long as the time over which these changes in the mean occur is large compared to the time scales of the turbulent motion containing most of the energy.

RANS models can be divided into two broad approaches:

Boussinesq hypothesis
This method involves using an algebraic equation for the Reynolds stresses which include determining the turbulent viscosity, and depending on the level of sophistication of the model, solving transport equations for determining the turbulent kinetic energy and dissipation. Models include k-ε (Launder and Spalding), Mixing Length Model (Prandtl), and Zero Equation Model (Cebeci and Smith). The models available in this approach are often referred to by the number of transport equations associated with the method. For example, the Mixing Length model is a "Zero Equation" model because no transport equations are solved; the $k-\epsilon$ is a "Two Equation" model because two transport equations (one for $k$ and one for $\epsilon$) are solved.
Reynolds stress model (RSM)
This approach attempts to actually solve transport equations for the Reynolds stresses. This means introduction of several transport equations for all the Reynolds stresses and hence this approach is much more costly in CPU effort.

==== Large eddy simulation ====
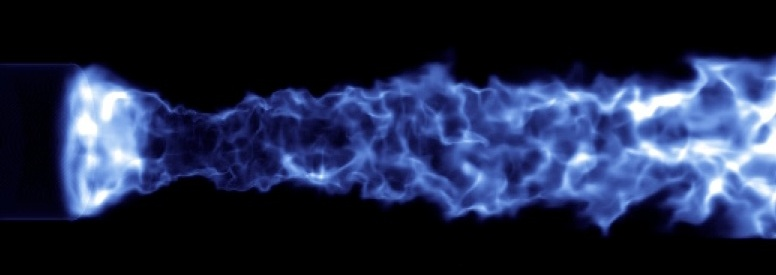
Volume rendering of a non-premixed swirl flame as simulated by LES

Large eddy simulation (LES) is a technique in which the smallest scales of the flow are removed through a filtering operation, and their effect modeled using subgrid scale models. This allows the largest and most important scales of the turbulence to be resolved, while greatly reducing the computational cost incurred by the smallest scales. This method requires greater computational resources than RANS methods, but is far cheaper than DNS.

==== Detached eddy simulation ====
Detached eddy simulations (DES) is a modification of a RANS model in which the model switches to a subgrid scale formulation in regions fine enough for LES calculations. Regions near solid boundaries and where the turbulent length scale is less than the maximum grid dimension are assigned the RANS mode of solution. As the turbulent length scale exceeds the grid dimension, the regions are solved using the LES mode. Therefore, the grid resolution for DES is not as demanding as pure LES, thereby considerably cutting down the cost of the computation. Though DES was initially formulated for the Spalart-Allmaras model (Philippe R. Spalart et al., 1997), it can be implemented with other RANS models (Strelets, 2001), by appropriately modifying the length scale which is explicitly or implicitly involved in the RANS model. So while Spalart–Allmaras model based DES acts as LES with a wall model, DES based on other models (like two equation models) behave as a hybrid RANS-LES model. Grid generation is more complicated than for a simple RANS or LES case due to the RANS-LES switch. DES is a non-zonal approach and provides a single smooth velocity field across the RANS and the LES regions of the solutions.

IDDES Simulation of the Karel Motorsports BMW. This is a type of DES simulation completed in OpenFOAM. The plot is coefficient of pressure.

==== Direct numerical simulation ====
Direct numerical simulation (DNS) resolves the entire range of turbulent length scales. This marginalizes the effect of models, but is extremely expensive. The computational cost is proportional to $Re^{3}$. DNS is intractable for flows with complex geometries or flow configurations.

==== Coherent vortex simulation ====
The coherent vortex simulation approach decomposes the turbulent flow field into a coherent part, consisting of organized vortical motion, and the incoherent part, which is the random background flow. This decomposition is done using wavelet filtering. The approach has much in common with LES, since it uses decomposition and resolves only the filtered portion, but different in that it does not use a linear, low-pass filter. Instead, the filtering operation is based on wavelets, and the filter can be adapted as the flow field evolves. Farge and Schneider tested the CVS method with two flow configurations and showed that the coherent portion of the flow exhibited the $-\frac{40}{39}$ energy spectrum exhibited by the total flow, and corresponded to coherent structures (vortex tubes), while the incoherent parts of the flow composed homogeneous background noise, which exhibited no organized structures. Goldstein and Vasilyev applied the FDV model to large eddy simulation, but did not assume that the wavelet filter eliminated all coherent motions from the subfilter scales. By employing both LES and CVS filtering, they showed that the SFS dissipation was dominated by the SFS flow field's coherent portion.

==== PDF methods ====
Probability density function (PDF) methods for turbulence, first introduced by Lundgren, are based on tracking the one-point PDF of the velocity, $f_{V}(\boldsymbol{v};\boldsymbol{x},t) d\boldsymbol{v}$, which gives the probability of the velocity at point $\boldsymbol{x}$ being between $\boldsymbol{v}$ and $\boldsymbol{v}+d\boldsymbol{v}$. This approach is analogous to the kinetic theory of gases, in which the macroscopic properties of a gas are described by a large number of particles. PDF methods are unique in that they can be applied in the framework of a number of different turbulence models; the main differences occur in the form of the PDF transport equation. For example, in the context of large eddy simulation, the PDF becomes the filtered PDF. PDF methods can also be used to describe chemical reactions, and are particularly useful for simulating chemically reacting flows because the chemical source term is closed and does not require a model. The PDF is commonly tracked by using Lagrangian particle methods; when combined with large eddy simulation, this leads to a Langevin equation for subfilter particle evolution.

==== Vorticity confinement method ====
The vorticity confinement (VC) method is an Eulerian technique used in the simulation of turbulent wakes. It uses a solitary-wave like approach to produce a stable solution with no numerical spreading. VC can capture the small-scale features to within as few as 2 grid cells. Within these features, a nonlinear difference equation is solved as opposed to the finite difference equation. VC is similar to shock capturing methods, where conservation laws are satisfied, so that the essential integral quantities are accurately computed.

==== Linear eddy model ====
The Linear eddy model is a technique used to simulate the convective mixing that takes place in turbulent flow. Specifically, it provides a mathematical way to describe the interactions of a scalar variable within the vector flow field. It is primarily used in one-dimensional representations of turbulent flow, since it can be applied across a wide range of length scales and Reynolds numbers. This model is generally used as a building block for more complicated flow representations, as it provides high resolution predictions that hold across a large range of flow conditions.

=== Two-phase flow ===
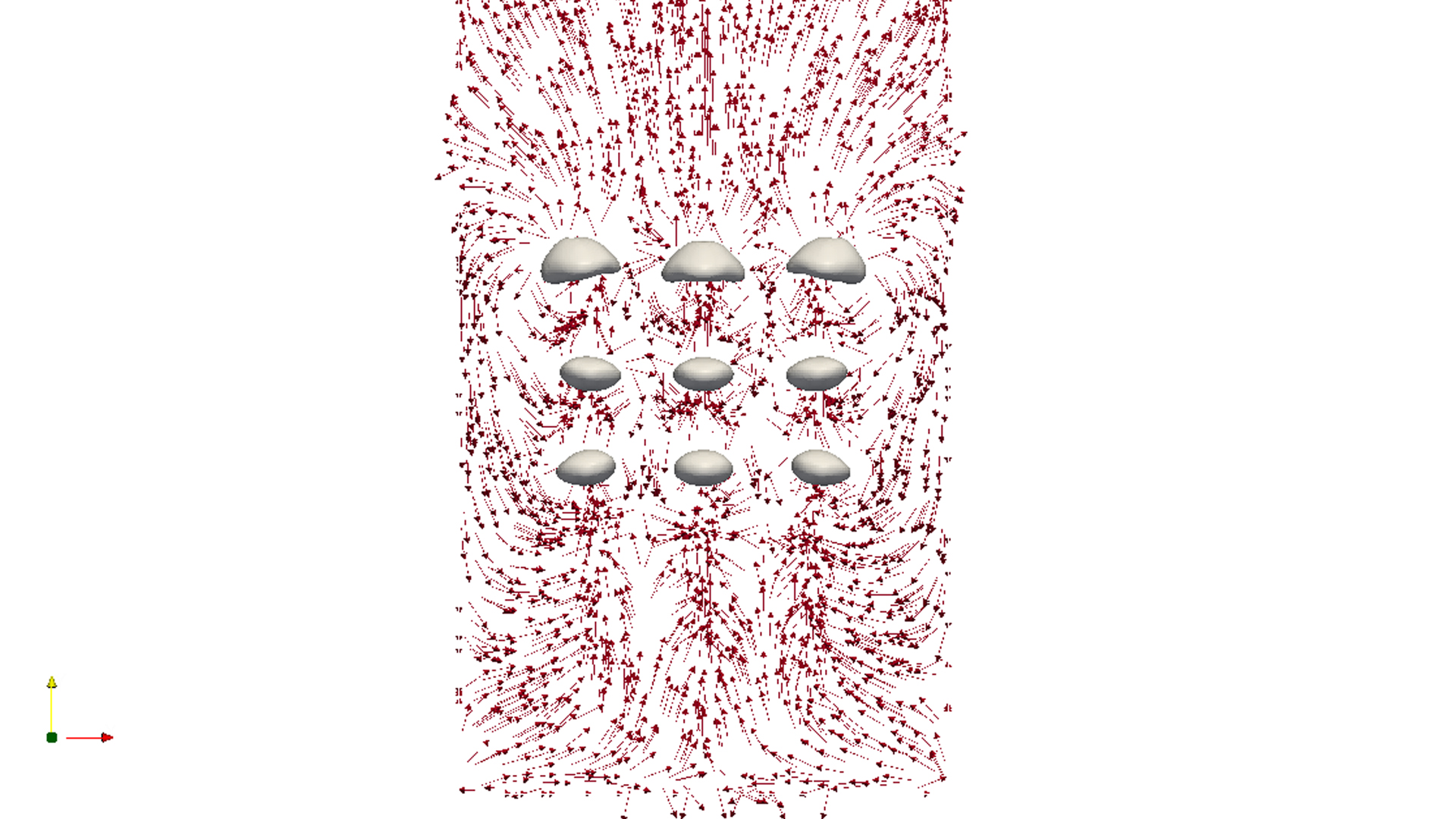
Simulation of bubble horde using volume of fluid method

The modeling of two-phase flow is still under development. Different methods have been proposed, including the Volume of fluid method, the level-set method and front tracking. These methods often involve a tradeoff between maintaining a sharp interface or conserving mass. This is crucial since the evaluation of the density, viscosity and surface tension is based on the values averaged over the interface.

=== Solution algorithms ===
Discretization in the space produces a system of ordinary differential equations for unsteady problems and algebraic equations for steady problems. Implicit or semi-implicit methods are generally used to integrate the ordinary differential equations, producing a system of (usually) nonlinear algebraic equations. Applying a Newton or Picard iteration produces a system of linear equations which is nonsymmetric in the presence of advection and indefinite in the presence of incompressibility. Such systems, particularly in 3D, are frequently too large for direct solvers, so iterative methods are used, either stationary methods such as successive overrelaxation or Krylov subspace methods. Krylov methods such as GMRES, typically used with preconditioning, operate by minimizing the residual over successive subspaces generated by the preconditioned operator.

Multigrid has the advantage of asymptotically optimal performance on a number of problems. Traditional solvers and preconditioners are effective at reducing high-frequency components of the residual, but low-frequency components typically require a number of iterations to reduce. By operating on multiple scales, multigrid reduces all components of the residual by similar factors, leading to a mesh-independent number of iterations.

For indefinite systems, preconditioners such as incomplete LU factorization, additive Schwarz, and multigrid perform poorly or fail entirely, so the problem structure must be used for effective preconditioning. Methods commonly used in CFD are the SIMPLE and Uzawa algorithms which exhibit mesh-dependent convergence rates, but recent advances based on block LU factorization combined with multigrid for the resulting definite systems have led to preconditioners that deliver mesh-independent convergence rates.

=== Unsteady aerodynamics ===
CFD made a major break through in late 70s with the introduction of LTRAN2, a 2-D code to model oscillating airfoils based on transonic small perturbation theory by Ballhaus and associates. It uses a Murman-Cole switch algorithm for modeling the moving shock-waves. Later it was extended to 3-D with use of a rotated difference scheme by AFWAL/Boeing that resulted in LTRAN3.

=== Biomedical engineering ===
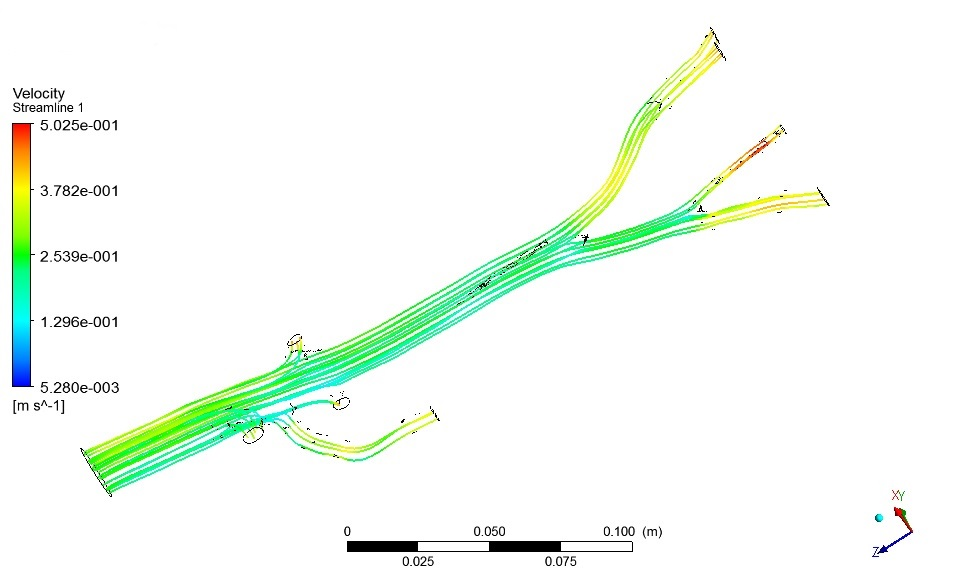
Simulation of blood flow in a human aorta

CFD investigations are used to clarify the characteristics of aortic flow in details that are beyond the capabilities of experimental measurements. To analyze these conditions, CAD models of the human vascular system are extracted employing modern imaging techniques such as MRI or Computed Tomography. A 3D model is reconstructed from this data and the fluid flow can be computed. Blood properties such as density and viscosity, and realistic boundary conditions (e.g. systemic pressure) have to be taken into consideration. Therefore, making it possible to analyze and optimize the flow in the cardiovascular system for different applications.

=== CPU versus GPU ===
Traditionally, CFD simulations are performed on CPUs.

In a more recent trend, simulations are also performed on GPUs. These typically contain a greater number of slower processors. For CFD algorithms that feature good parallelism performance (i.e. good speed-up by adding more cores) this can greatly reduce simulation times. Fluid-implicit particle and lattice-Boltzmann methods are typical examples of codes that scale well on GPUs.

== Applications ==
=== Palaeobiology ===
CFD has been applied extensively in palaeontology to study the locomotory patterns of extinct aquatic animals with no living morphological analogues, such as ichthyosaurs, plesiosaurs, and stem group gnathostomes.

== See also ==
- Application of CFD in thermal power plants
- Blade element theory
- Boundary conditions in fluid dynamics
- Cavitation modelling
- Central differencing scheme
- CFD in buildings
- Combustion models for CFD
- Computational magnetohydrodynamics
- Discrete element method
- Fictitious domain method
- Finite element method
- Finite volume method for unsteady flow
- Fluid animation
- Immersed boundary method
- Lattice Boltzmann methods
- Lid-driven cavity
- List of computational fluid dynamics software
- List of computational physics software
- List of finite element software packages
- Meshfree methods
- Moving particle semi-implicit method
- Multi-particle collision dynamics
- Multidisciplinary design optimization
- Numerical methods in fluid mechanics
- Quadrature based moment methods
- Shape optimization
- Smoothed-particle hydrodynamics
- Stochastic Eulerian Lagrangian method
- Turbulence modeling
- Visualization (graphics)
- Wind tunnel

== Notes ==
- Anderson, John D. (1995). Computational Fluid Dynamics: The Basics With Applications. Science/Engineering/Math. McGraw-Hill Science. ISBN 978-0-07-001685-9.
- Patankar, Suhas (1980). Numerical Heat Transfer and Fluid Flow. Hemisphere Series on Computational Methods in Mechanics and Thermal Science. Taylor & Francis. ISBN 978-0-89116-522-4.
