= Lax–Friedrichs method =

Mathematical method

The Lax–Friedrichs method, named after Peter Lax and Kurt O. Friedrichs, is a numerical method for the solution of hyperbolic partial differential equations based on finite differences. The method can be described as the FTCS (forward in time, centered in space) scheme with a numerical dissipation term of 1/2. One can view the Lax–Friedrichs method as an alternative to Godunov's scheme, where one avoids solving a Riemann problem at each cell interface, at the expense of adding artificial viscosity.

== Illustration for a Linear Problem ==
Consider a one-dimensional, linear hyperbolic partial differential equation for $u(x,t)$ of the form:
$$u_t + a u_x = 0$$
on the domain
$$b \leq x \leq c,\; 0 \leq t \leq d$$
with initial condition
$$u(x,0) = u_0(x)\,$$
and the boundary conditions
$$\begin{align}
u(b,t) &= u_b(t) \\
u(c,t) &= u_c(t).
\end{align}$$

If one discretizes the domain $(b, c) \times (0, d)$ to a grid with equally spaced points with a spacing of $\Delta x$ in the $x$-direction and $\Delta t$ in the $t$-direction, we introduce an approximation $\tilde u$ of $u$
$$u_i^n = \tilde u(x_i, t^n) ~~\text{ with }~~
\begin{array}{l}x_i = b + i\,\Delta x ,\\ t^n = n\,\Delta t\end{array}
~~\text{ for }~~
\begin{array}{l}i = 0,\ldots,N ,\\ n = 0,\ldots,M,\end{array}$$
where
$$N = \frac{c - b}{\Delta x} ,\, M = \frac{d}{\Delta t}$$
are integers representing the number of grid intervals. Then the Lax–Friedrichs method to approximate the partial differential equation is given by:
$$\frac{u_i^{n+1} - \frac{1}{2}(u_{i+1}^n + u_{i-1}^n)}{\Delta t} + a\frac{u_{i+1}^n - u_{i-1}^n}{2\,\Delta x} = 0$$

Or, rewriting this to solve for the unknown $u_i^{n+1},$
$$u_i^{n+1} = \frac{1}{2} \left(u_{i+1}^n + u_{i-1}^n\right) - a\frac{\Delta t}{2\,\Delta x} \left(u_{i+1}^n - u_{i-1}^n\right)$$

Where the initial values and boundary nodes are taken from
$$\begin{align}
u_i^0 &= u_0(x_i) \\
u_0^n &= u_b(t^n) \\
u_N^n &= u_c(t^n).
\end{align}$$

== Extensions to Nonlinear Problems ==
A nonlinear hyperbolic conservation law is defined through a flux function $f$:
$$u_t + ( f(u) )_x = 0.$$

In the case of $f(u) = a u$, we end up with a scalar linear problem. Note that in general, $u$ is a vector with $m$ equations in it. The generalization of the Lax-Friedrichs method to nonlinear systems takes the form
$$u_i^{n+1} = \frac{1}{2} \left(u_{i+1}^n + u_{i-1}^n\right) - \frac{\Delta t}{2\,\Delta x} \left( f( u_{i+1}^n ) - f( u_{i-1}^n ) \right).$$

This method is conservative and first order accurate, hence quite dissipative. It can, however be used as a building block for building high-order numerical schemes for solving hyperbolic partial differential equations, much like Euler time steps can be used as a building block for creating high-order numerical integrators for ordinary differential equations.

We note that this method can be written in conservation form:
$$u_i^{n+1} = u^n_i - \frac{\Delta t}{ \Delta x} \left( \hat{f}^n_{i+1/2} - \hat{f}^n_{i-1/2} \right),$$
where
$$\hat{f}^n_{i-1/2} = \frac{1}{2} \left( f_{i-1} + f_{i} \right) - \frac{ \Delta x}{ 2 \Delta t  } \left( u^n_{i} - u^n_{i-1} \right).$$

Without the extra terms $u^n_i$ and $u^n_{i-1}$ in the discrete flux, $\hat{f}^n_{i-1/2}$, one ends up with the FTCS scheme, which is well known to be unconditionally unstable for hyperbolic problems.

== Stability and accuracy ==
Example problem initial condition

Lax-Friedrichs solution

This method is explicit and first order accurate in time and first order accurate in space ($O(\Delta t) + O({\Delta x^2}/{\Delta t}))$ provided $u_0(x),\, u_b(t),\, u_c(t)$ are sufficiently-smooth functions. Under these conditions, the method is stable if and only if the following condition is satisfied:
$$\left| a\frac{\Delta t}{\Delta x} \right| \leq 1.$$

(A von Neumann stability analysis can show the necessity of this stability condition.) The Lax–Friedrichs method is classified as having second-order dissipation and third order dispersion. For functions that have discontinuities, the scheme displays strong dissipation and dispersion; see figures at right.
