= FTCS scheme =

Method in numerical analysis

In numerical analysis, the FTCS (forward time-centered space) method is a finite difference method used for numerically solving the heat equation and similar parabolic partial differential equations. It is a first-order method in time, explicit in time, and is conditionally stable when applied to the heat equation. When used as a method for advection equations, or more generally hyperbolic partial differential equations, it is unstable unless artificial viscosity is included. The abbreviation FTCS was first used by Patrick Roache.

== The method ==
The FTCS method is based on the forward Euler method in time (hence "forward time") and central difference in space (hence "centered space"), giving first-order convergence in time and second-order convergence in space. For example, in one dimension, if the partial differential equation is

$$\frac{\partial u}{\partial t} = F\left(u, x, t, \frac{\partial^2 u}{\partial x^2}\right)$$

then, letting $u(i \,\Delta x, n\, \Delta t) = u_{i}^{n}\,$, the forward Euler method is given by:

$$\frac{u_{i}^{n + 1} - u_{i}^{n}}{\Delta t} =
F_{i}^{n}\left(u, x, t, \frac{\partial^2 u}{\partial x^2}\right)$$

The function $F$ must be discretized spatially with a central difference scheme. This is an explicit method which means that, $u_{i}^{n+1}$ can be explicitly computed (no need of solving a system of algebraic equations) if values of $u$ at previous time level $(n)$ are known. FTCS method is computationally inexpensive since the method is explicit.

== Illustration: one-dimensional heat equation ==
The FTCS method is often applied to diffusion problems. As an example, for 1D heat equation,

$$\frac{\partial u}{\partial t} = \alpha \frac{\partial^2 u}{\partial x^2}$$

the FTCS scheme is given by:

$$\frac{u_{i}^{n + 1} - u_{i}^{n}}{\Delta t} = \alpha \frac{u_{i + 1}^{n} - 2 u_{i}^{n} + u_{i - 1}^{n}
}{\Delta x^2}$$

or, letting $r = \frac{\alpha\, \Delta t}{\Delta x^2}$:

$$u_{i}^{n + 1} = u_{i}^{n} + r \left(u_{i + 1}^{n} - 2 u_{i}^{n} + u_{i - 1}^{n}
\right)$$

== Stability ==
As derived using von Neumann stability analysis, the FTCS method for the one-dimensional heat equation is numerically stable if and only if the following condition is satisfied:

$$\Delta t \leq \frac{\Delta x^2}{2 \alpha}.$$

Which is to say that the choice of $\Delta x$ and $\Delta t$ must satisfy the above condition for the FTCS scheme to be stable. In two-dimensions, the condition becomes

$$\Delta t \leq \frac{1}{2 \alpha\left(\frac{1}{\Delta x^2} + \frac{1}{\Delta y^2}\right)}.$$

If we choose $h = \Delta x = \Delta y = \Delta z$, then the stability conditions become $\Delta t \leq h^2/(2\alpha)$, $\Delta t \leq h^2/(4\alpha)$, and $\Delta t \leq h^2/(6\alpha)$ for one-, two-, and three-dimensional applications, respectively.

A major drawback of the FTCS method is that for problems with large diffusivity $\alpha$, satisfactory step sizes can be too small to be practical.

For hyperbolic partial differential equations, the linear test problem is the constant coefficient advection equation, as opposed to the heat equation (or diffusion equation), which is the correct choice for a parabolic differential equation. It is well known that for these hyperbolic problems, any choice of $\Delta t$ results in an unstable scheme.

== See also ==
- Partial differential equations
- Crank–Nicolson method
- Finite-difference time-domain method
