= Robert D. Richtmyer =

American mathematician

Robert Davis Richtmyer
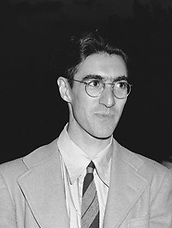
- Richtmyer in 1946
- Born: October 10, 1910; Ithaca, New York
- Died: September 24, 2003 (aged 92); Gardner, Colorado
- Education: University of Göttingen; Cornell University; M.I.T.
- Known for: Dielectric resonator antenna Monte Carlo N-Particle Transport Code; Richtmyer method Richtmyer–Meshkov instability Lax–Richtmyer theorem
- Awards: Leroy P. Steele Prize (1990); Guggenheim Fellowship (1961)
- Scientific career
- Workplaces: Stanford University; University of Colorado at Boulder
- Thesis: Quantum Mechanical Study of Multiple-Ionization Collisions of a Fast Electron with an Atom (1935)
- Doctoral advisor: John C. Slater
- Doctoral students: George Logemann

Robert Davis Richtmyer (October 10, 1910 – September 24, 2003) was an American physicist, mathematician, educator, author, and musician.

== Biography ==
Richtmyer was born on October 10, 1910, in Ithaca, New York. His father was physicist Floyd K. Richtmyer (1881–1939) and mother was Bernice Davis Richtmyer. He studied physics at the University of Göttingen and Cornell University, graduating in 1932 when his father was dean of the graduate school. He received a Ph.D. from the Massachusetts Institute of Technology in 1935 under advisor John C. Slater. He taught at Stanford University as an instructor in the physics department from 1936 through 1940. During World War II he worked at Los Alamos National Laboratory, and became the leader of the theoretical division after the war.

A letter sent March 11, 1947, from John von Neumann to Richtmyer outlined a technique for approximating complex problems being studied at Los Alamos by Stanislaw Ulam. Richtmyer used the massive IBM SSEC calculator for some of the first large-scale uses of what would be called the Monte Carlo method.

In 1953 Richtmyer joined the faculty of Courant Institute of Mathematical Sciences at New York University. In 1956 he published a paper with Peter Lax proving the Lax–Richtmyer equivalence theorem. It is sometimes called the fundamental theorem of numerical analysis. Starting in 1964, he taught mathematics and physics at the University of Colorado at Boulder until his retirement in the early 1980s.

He was the author of textbooks including the well known Introduction to Modern Physics with several printed editions with E.H.Kennard and other authors, Principles of Advanced Mathematical Physics in 1978. In 1990 he was awarded the Leroy P. Steele Prize from the American Mathematical Society for his book Difference Methods for Initial-Value Problems.

He also played violin with the Boulder Philharmonic Orchestra. Richtmyer died on September 24, 2003, in Gardner, Colorado. He was survived by daughters Anna Degen and Roberta Cookingham. An adopted son, Haile Michael Mezghebe (born 1948), is a physician at the George Washington University Medical Center who helped start the first postgraduate medical education program in his native Eritrea.

== Works ==
- J. VonNeumann, R. D. Richtmyer (1950). A Method for the Numerical Calculation of Hydrodynamic Shocks. Journal of Applied Physics, Vol. 21, No. 3., pp. 232–237.(Classic article on the numerical solution of hydrodynamic problems)
- R. D. Richtmyer (1960). "Taylor instability in a shock acceleration of compressible fluids", Communications on Pure and Applied Mathematics 13, 297–319. (Predicted the Richtmyer–Meshkov instability)
- R. D. Richtmyer and K. W. Morton (1967). Difference Methods for Initial-Value Problems. Second edition. Wiley-Interscience.
- R. D. Richtmyer (1967). Stability of a New Radio Flash Code. Los Alamos Scientific Laboratory, NM (LA-3864-MS).
- R. D. Richtmyer (1978), Principles of Advanced Mathematical Physics Vol. 1 & 2, Springer-Verlag, New York.

== See also ==
- Dielectric resonator
