= Defected ground structure =

Intentional defect in the ground strip of a printed circuit board

In printed circuit board manufacturing, a defected ground structure (DGS) is a purposefully-created defect on the ground plane of a printed microstrip board. It is typically created in the form of an etched-out pattern on the ground plane. DGS is a simplified form of an electromagnetic band gap (EBG) structure. This EBG is a periodic pattern featuring a band-stop property in microstrip transmission line and circuit applications, but the DGS comprises a single defect or a very limited number of defects with periodic/aperiodic configurations.

== History ==
Kim et al. first conceived a limited form of EBG and coined the term 'DGS'. They used a single unit of dumbbell-shaped defect beneath a microstrip line to use its stop-band characteristics within which it impedes the propagation of electromagnetic (EM) down the line over a range of frequencies. The compact feature and ease of implementation made it popular and several other shapes of DGS evolved very fast for various microwave circuit applications. Printed circuit filter is one of them. Apart from that, DGS has also been used in the circuits of an amplifier, rat-race coupler, branch-line coupler, Wilkinson power divider, etc. DGS was also employed underneath the feed lines to integrated microstrip antenna in order to filter out any unwanted harmonics.

== Ideas for antenna applications ==
A new concept of its application to microstrip antenna was first reported in 2005 by Guha et al. The main focus was to suppress the cross-polarized radiations in a circular microstrip patch. DGS was strategically used to weaken the cross-pol generating higher-order TM21 mode. The important and necessary condition is that the deployed DGS should not influence or disturb the main resonance, i.e. the primary radiation mode. That work indeed introduced a non-resonant DGS and proved the concept. Subsequently, several advancements both in DGS type, geometry, and cross-polar performance have been achieved.

Another idea of patch-DGS integration has advanced the microstrip antenna array design. The issue of mutual coupling among the array elements can be reduced by integrating simple DGS- first reported in 2006. This technique has been matured to address the practical issue of "scan blindness" of large arrays.
