= Debatosh Guha =

Debatosh Guha দেবতোষ গুহ
- Debatosh Guha
- Education: Institute of Radio Physics and Electronics, Rajabazar Science College (University of Calcutta)
- Notable work: Introduced the concept of Defected Ground Structure (DGS) based antenna engineering and a wide range of its applications
- Website: http://dguha.info

Debatosh Guha (Bengali:দেবতোষ গুহ ) is an Indian researcher and educator. He is a Professor at the Institute of Radio Physics and Electronics at the Rajabazar Science College, University of Calcutta. He is Indian National Academy of Engineering INAE Chair Professor and also served Indian Institute of Technology Kharagpur (IIT Khargapur) as HAL Chair Professor (2015-2016) and the National Institute of Technology Jaipur as an Adjunct faculty (2023-2025).

== Education and career ==
He received the B. Tech. and M. Tech. degrees in Radio Physics and Electronics from the Rajabazar Science College campus of University of Calcutta in 1987 and 1989, respectively. He spent about a few months at a wireless industry of Webel-Philips in Kolkata before joining University of Calcutta with senior research fellowship from the CSIR, Government of India, and obtained his Ph. D. degree in microwave engineering in 1994. In the same year, Guha was appointed as an assistant professor in Radio Physics and Electronics at the University of Calcutta. He had undertaken his post-doctoral research at the Royal Military College of Canada at Kingston, Ontario.

At the University of Calcutta, he has been a department head (2016–2018), Director of the Centre for Research in Nanoscience and Nanotechnology (2017–2019), and Dean of Faculty of Engineering and Technology (2023–2025).

Guha was elected a fellow of IEEE, and also a Fellow of all four Indian National Academies for Science and Engineering such as Indian National Science Academy (INSA), the Indian Academy of Sciences (IASc), the National Academy of Sciences, India (NASI), and the Indian National Academy of Engineering (INAE). He is former Abdul Kalam Technology Innovation National Fellow, Govt. of India (2020-2025) and a Recipient of J C Bose Grant (formerly known as J C Bose Fellow), Govt. of India (2025).

He has been a visiting professor at the Royal Military College of Canada (2007, 2008, 2010, 2012, 2013, 2017, 2018) and visiting scientists/invited speaker to several foreign universities viz. the University of Houston (2002), Queen Mary University of London (2006), University of Bath (2006), Communication Research Centre, Ottawa (2006), University of Alberta (2012), San Diego State University (2014), Karlsruhe Institute of Technology (2014), Chuo University Tokyo (2014), City University of Hong Kong (2016), University of Waterloo (2017), Sapienza Università di Roma (2022), Università di Pisa (2022), Hokkaido University (2023), Kumamoto University (2023), The City University of New York (2023), New Jersey Institute of Technology (2023), Florida International University (2024), Hiroshima University (2024), University of Trento (2024), University of Missouri-Kansas City (2024), Tokyo University of Agriculture and Technology (2025).

A recipient of the Jawaharlal Nehru Memorial Fund Prize, he was awarded the 1996 URSI Young Scientist Award at Lille, France; 2012 Raj Mitra Travel Grant Award of IEEE AP Society in Chicago; 2016 IETE Ram Lal Wadhwa Award at New Delhi; and 2020 IPCR’s Acharya P C Ray Memorial Award for Distinguished Achievements in Innovations in Science and Technology at Kolkata.

He has served the IEEE Fields Award Committee of IEEE AP-Society as a member (2018–2019) and the Indian Joint National Committee as URSI Commission-B Lead for 2015-2020. He has served both IEEE Transactions on Antennas and Propagation and IEEE Antennas and Wireless Propagation Letters as an associate editor, and IEEE Antennas and Propagation Magazine as a Section Editor.

He has been closely associated with IEEE and URSI and served URSI Commission-B as the Indian representative. He served IEEE Kolkata Section as the chair (2013–2014) and IEEE AP/MTT Kolkata Chapter as the founding Chair. In 2007, he introduced IEEE Applied Electromagnetics Conference (AEMC) as a major biennial International meeting in India and co-chaired its first three sessions in 2007, 2009, and 2011. In 2010, he established IEEE Indian Antenna Week (IAW) as an annual International Antenna Workshop with fabulous support from the IEEE AP-Society and chaired the first two editions in Mayfair Puri (2010) and Hyatt Regency Kolkata (2011). He has also been associated with the organizations of several international events including APCAP, EMTS, EUCAP, URSI-GASS, URSI AP-RASC.

== Awards and honours ==
With Dr. A. S. Kiran Kumar (front, left), Chairman, ISRO (IETE Award Ceremony 2016)

INAE Chair Professor (2026)

Awardee J C Bose Grant (formerly known as J C Bose National Fellow), Govt of India (2025)

Abdul Kalam Technology Innovation National Fellow, Govt of India (2020-2025)

Fellow, IEEE

Fellow, Indian National Science Academy

Fellow, Indian Academy of Sciences

Fellow, The National Academy of Sciences, India

Fellow, Indian National Academy of Engineering

Fellow, West Bengal Academy of Science and Technology

Fellow, Institution of Electronics and Telecommunication Engineers

Acharyya Prafulla Chandra Ray Memorial Award for Distinguished Achievements in Innovations in Science and Technology (IPCR, Kolkata) 2020

IETE Ram Lal Wadhwa Award (New Delhi, 2016)

IEEE AP-S Raj Mittra Travel Grant Award (Chicago 2012)

URSI Young Scientist Award (Lille, France 1996)

Jawaharlal Nehru Memorial Fund Prize (New Delhi, 1984)

== Research and published works ==
Guha and his research group have contributed towards the development of science and engineering for both microstrip antennas and dielectric resonator antennas (DRAs).

Guha introduced the concept of defected ground structure (DGS) integration technique to microstrip antennas and developed the theoretical understanding followed by experiments. His group explained the mechanism of weakening the cross-pol generating modes and mitigating two major issues in microstrip elements and arrays: (i) high cross-polarized radiations and (ii) mutual coupling among array elements causing scan-blindness in the radiation patterns.

A long challenging issue of high cross-polarized radiations occurring across the diagonal planes of a microstrip patch has been resolved by his group in 2020. The source of the problem has been theoretically identified along with some representative solutions in two different ground current conditions.

His original contributions to dielectric resonator antennas encompass (i) the introduction of a new radiating mode in cylindrical DRAs and (ii) the concept of multi-mode engineering - a more theory-based methodology using composite and hybrid structures, which changed the traditional concept of wideband or ultra-wideband DRA designs. To establish the viability of the new mode, he has developed new feeding techniques which should ideally satisfy the requirement of integratable feed for mm-wave tiny antennas.

=== Book ===
Defected Ground Structure Based Antennas, IEEE PRESS-WILEY (USA), 2023

Microstrip and Printed Antennas: New Trends, Techniques, and Applications, Wiley UK, 2011
