= Phyllis Nicolson =

British mathematician (1917–1968)

- Born: Phyllis Lockett; 21 September 1917; Macclesfield, England
- Died: 6 October 1968 (aged 51); Sheffield, England
- Education: Manchester University
- Known for: Crank–Nicolson method
- Scientific career
- Fields: Mathematics, Physics
- Thesis: Three Problems in Theoretical Physics

Phyllis Nicolson (21 September 1917 – 6 October 1968) was a British mathematician and physicist best known for her work on the Crank–Nicolson method together with John Crank.

== Early life and education ==
Nicolson was born Phyllis Lockett in Macclesfield and went to Stockport High School for Girls. She graduated from Manchester University with a B.Sc. in 1938, M.Sc. in 1939 and a Ph.D. on Three Problems in Theoretical Physics in 1946. Her Ph.D. thesis began with cosmic ray research conducted under Lajos Jánossy during 1939 and 1940.

== Hartree Differential Analyser work ==
Nicolson's Ph.D. was expected to be submitted in 1941 but was interrupted by wartime work with Douglas Hartree's research group at Manchester University from 1940 to 1945. During this time, Nicolson became a proficient numerical analyst and an expert user of Hartree's differential analyser. Nicolson, along with other members of the research group worked on defence-related problems for the Air Defence Research and Development Establishment (later the Radar Research and Development Establishment), both part of the Ministry of Supply. Nicolson's two significant bodies of wartime research, "Transient behaviour in the single anode magnetron" and "heat conduction", formed the basis of parts II and III of her 1946 PhD thesis Three Problems in Theoretical Physics.

Nicolson's research on heat conduction related to solutions of the heat equation, and with her colleague John Crank she investigated the numerical stability of several solution techniques. The algorithm now known as the Crank–Nicolson method emerged from this work and was published in 1947.

== Postwar life and work ==
Nicolson was a research student in Cambridge from 1945 and completed her Ph.D. thesis completed at the Victoria University of Manchester (now Manchester University) in 1946. She was a Tucker-Price Research Fellow of Girton College, Cambridge from 1946 to 1949, working at the Cavendish Laboratory. Nicolson moved to Leeds around January 1950 with her husband Malcolm Nicolson, also a physicist, as he had been appointed to a lectureship in Physics at Leeds University. Phyllis Nicolson had married Malcolm in 1942 and they had two sons, Donald Macleod Nicolson (born 20 September 1947 in Cambridge) and Roderick Ian Nicolson (born 5 February 1950 in Leeds).

Malcolm Nicolson, aged 33, died in a train accident in December 1951, and Phyllis was appointed to take over his lectureship. In 1955, Nicolson married physicist Malcolm McCaig, who had a son Ian McCaig (born February 1946) from a previous marriage. In May 1957, Nicolson and McCaig had a son together, Andrew Malcolm McCaig. All three of Nicolson's sons ended up getting PhDs – in mathematics, psychology, and geology.

Nicolson died from breast cancer in 1968 in Sheffield.

== Publications ==
- D. R. Hartree, P. Nicolson, N. Eyres. J. Howlett, and T. Pearcey. “Evaluation of the Solution of the Wave Equation for a Stratified Medium”, Air Defense Research & Development Establishment, Memorandum 47, May 1944.
- D. R. Hartree, P. Nicolson, N. Eyres. J. Howlett, and T. Pearcey. “Evaluation of the Solution of the Wave Equation for a Stratified Medium:Normalisation”, Radar Research and Development Establishment, RRDE Report No. 279, March 1945.
- Three Problems in Theoretical Physics. PhD Thesis, University of Manchester, 1946.
- The Sun's Magnetic Field and the Diurnal and Seasonal Variations in Cosmic Ray Intensity Janossy, L.; Lockett, P., Proc. of the Royal Society of London. Series A, Mathematical and Physical Sciences, 1941, Vol. 178(972), pp. 52–60.
- Meson Formation and the Geomagnetic Effects. Janossy, L.; Nicolson, P., Proc. of the Royal Society of London. Series A, Mathematical and Physical Sciences, 1947, Vol. 192(1028), pp. 99–114.
- A practical method for numerical evaluation of solutions of partial differential equations of the heat-conduction type, Crank, J.; Nicolson, P., Mathematical Proc. of the Cambridge Phil. Society, 1947, Vol. 43(1), pp. 50–67.
- A Theoretical Study of the Influence of Diffusion and Chemical Reaction Velocity on the Rate of Exchange of Carbon Monoxide and Oxygen between the Red Blood Corpuscle and the Surrounding Fluid, P. Nicolson and F. J. W. Roughton. Proc. of the Royal Society of London. Series B, Biological Sciences, Vol. 138, No. 891, 1951, pp. 241–264.
