= John Crank =

English mathematical physicist

- Born: 6 February 1916; Hindley, Lancashire, England
- Died: 3 October 2006 (aged 90)
- Education: Manchester University
- Known for: Crank–Nicolson method
- Scientific career
- Fields: Mathematics
- Workplaces: Brunel University
- Doctoral advisor: William Lawrence Bragg

John Crank (6 February 1916 – 3 October 2006) was a mathematical physicist, best known for his work on the numerical solution of partial differential equations.

Crank was born in Hindley in Lancashire, England. His father was a carpenter's pattern-maker. Crank studied at Manchester University from 1934 to 1938, where he was awarded a BSc and MSc as a student of Lawrence Bragg and Douglas Hartree. In 1953, Manchester University awarded him a DSc.

He worked on ballistics during the Second World War, and was then a mathematical physicist at Courtaulds Fundamental Research Laboratory from 1945 to 1957. In 1957, he was appointed as the first Head of Department of Mathematics at Brunel College in Acton. He served two terms of office as vice-principal of Brunel before his retirement in 1981, when he was granted the title of professor emeritus.

Crank's main work was on the numerical solution of partial differential equations and, in particular, the solution of heat-conduction problems. He is best known for his work with Phyllis Nicolson on the heat equation, which resulted in the Crank–Nicolson method.

He was a keen gardener and established the John Crank Garden as a retirement gift to Brunel University. His wife was Joan.
