= Dielectric resonator antenna =

High-frequency radio antenna

A dielectric resonator antenna (DRA) is a radio antenna mostly used at microwave frequencies and higher, that consists of a block of ceramic material of various shapes, the dielectric resonator, mounted on a metal surface, a ground plane. Radio waves are introduced into the inside of the resonator material from the transmitter circuit and bounce back and forth between the resonator walls, forming standing waves. The walls of the resonator are partially transparent to radio waves, allowing the radio power to radiate into space.

An advantage of dielectric resonator antennas is they lack metal parts, which become lossy at high frequencies, dissipating energy. So these antennas can have lower losses and be more efficient than metal antennas at high microwave and millimeter wave frequencies. Dielectric waveguide antennas are used in some compact portable wireless devices, and military millimeter-wave radar equipment. The antenna was first proposed by Robert Richtmyer in 1939. In 1982, Long et al. did the first design and test of dielectric resonator antennas considering a leaky waveguide model assuming magnetic conductor model of the dielectric surface . In that very first investigation, Long et al. explored HEM11d mode in a cylindrical shaped ceramic block to radiate broadside. After three decades, yet another mode (HEM12d) bearing identical broadside pattern has been introduced by Guha in 2012.

An antenna like effect is achieved by periodic swing of electrons from its capacitive element to the ground plane which behaves like an inductor. The authors further argued that the operation of a dielectric antenna resembles the antenna conceived by Marconi, the only difference is that inductive element is replaced by the dielectric material. The configuraiton offers a framework where the geometric symmetry of the electric field in free space is explicitly broken by the floating inductor-capacitor system with one end excited by a time varying voltage source.

== Features ==
Dielectric resonator antennas offer the following attractive features:

- The dimension of a DRA is the order of $\frac{\lambda_0} {\sqrt{\varepsilon_r}}$, where $\lambda_0$ is the free-space wavelength and $\varepsilon_r$ is the dielectric constant of the resonator material. Thus, by choosing a high value of $\varepsilon_r$ ($\varepsilon_r\approx10-100$), the size of the DRA can be significantly reduced.
- There is no inherent conductor loss in dielectric resonators. This leads to high radiation efficiency of the antenna. This feature is especially attractive for millimeter (mm)-wave antennas, where the loss in metal fabricated antennas can be high.
- DRAs offer simple coupling schemes to nearly all transmission lines used at microwave and mm-wave frequencies. This makes them suitable for integration into different planar technologies. The coupling between a DRA and the planar transmission line can be easily controlled by varying the position of the DRA with respect to the line. The performance of DRA can therefore be easily optimized experimentally.
- The operating bandwidth of a DRA can be varied over a wide range by suitably choosing resonator parameters. For example, the bandwidth of the lower order modes of a DRA can be easily varied from a fraction of a percent to about 20% or more by the suitable choice of the dielectric constant of the material and/or by strategic shaping of the DRA element.
- Use of multiple modes radiating identically has also been successfully addressed. One such example is hybrid combination of dielectric ring-resonator and electric monopole which was initially explored by Lapierre. Multiple identical monopole-type modes in an annular shaped dielectric ring-resonator were theoretically analyzed by Guha to show their unique combinations with that due to a traditional electric monopole resulting in UWB antennas.
- Each mode of a DRA has a unique internal and associated external field distribution. Therefore, different radiation characteristics can be obtained by exciting different modes of a DRA.
- Differently radiating modes have also been employed to generate identical radiation patterns using composite geometries, with a special feature of wider bandwidth.

== See also ==
- Dielectric waveguide
- Dielectric wireless receiver
