= Numerical methods for ordinary differential equations =

Methods used to find numerical solutions of ordinary differential equations

Illustration of numerical integration for the differential equation $y'=y, y(0)=1.$ Blue: Euler method Green: Midpoint method Red: Exact solution: $y=e^t$. The step size is $h=1.0$.

The same illustration for $h=0.25.$ The midpoint method converges faster than the Euler method, as $h \to 0$.

Numerical methods for ordinary differential equations are methods used to find numerical approximations to the solutions of ordinary differential equations (ODEs). Their use is also known as "numerical integration", although this term can also refer to the computation of integrals.

Many differential equations cannot be solved exactly. For practical purposes, however, a numerical approximation to the solution is often sufficient. The algorithms studied here can be used to compute such an approximation. An alternative method is to use techniques from calculus to obtain a series expansion of the solution.

Ordinary differential equations occur in many scientific disciplines, including physics, chemistry, biology, and economics. In addition, some numerical methods for partial differential equations convert the partial differential equation into a system of ordinary differential equations, which can then be solved numerically.

== Initial value problems ==
An Initial value problem (IVP) is a first-order differential equation plus an initial condition,

$$y'(t) = f(t,y(t)), \qquad y(t_0)=y_0,$$	1

where $f$ is a function $f:[t_0, \infty) \times \R^d \to \R^d$, and $y_0 \in \R^d$ is a given vector. First-order means that only the first derivative of $y$ appears in the equation, and higher derivatives are absent.

Without loss of generality to higher-order systems, we restrict ourselves to first-order differential equations, because a higher-order ODE can be converted into a larger system of first-order equations by introducing extra variables. For example, the second-order equation $y''=-y$ can be rewritten as two first-order equations: $y' = z$ and $z'=-y$.

In this section, we describe numerical methods for IVPs. Boundary value problems (BVPs) require a different set of tools, discussed in the section below.

The Picard–Lindelöf theorem states that the IVP has a unique solution, provided that $f$ is Lipschitz-continuous.

== Methods ==
Numerical methods for solving first-order IVPs often fall into one of two large categories: linear multistep methods, which make use of information from previous steps to obtain the next step, or Runge–Kutta methods, which use intermediate stages to calculate the next step.

A further division is between explicit and implicit methods. Explicit methods only involve information from the current and previous steps, whereas implicit methods involve the next step, requiring the solution of an equation to solve for the next step.

For example, implicit linear multistep methods include Adams-Moulton methods, and backward differentiation methods (BDF), whereas implicit Runge–Kutta methods include diagonally implicit Runge–Kutta (DIRK), singly diagonally implicit Runge–Kutta (SDIRK), and Gauss–Radau (based on Gaussian quadrature) numerical methods. Explicit examples from the linear multistep family include the Adams–Bashforth methods, and any Runge–Kutta method with a lower diagonal Butcher tableau is explicit. A loose rule of thumb dictates that stiff differential equations require the use of implicit schemes, whereas non-stiff problems can be solved more efficiently with explicit schemes.

The so-called general linear methods (GLMs) are a generalization of the above two large classes of methods.

=== Euler method ===
Euler's method can be thought of as approximating a nearby point on a curve by moving a short distance along a line tangent to the curve.

Starting with the differential equation (1), we replace the derivative $y'$ by the finite difference approximation

$$y'(t) \approx \frac{y(t+h) - y(t)}{h},$$	2

which when re-arranged yields the following formula
$$y(t+h) \approx y(t) + hy'(t)$$
and using (1) gives:

$$y(t+h) \approx y(t) + hf(t,y(t)).$$	3

This formula is usually applied in the following way. We choose a step size h, and we construct the sequence $t_0, t_1 = t_0 + h, t_2 = t_0 + 2h, \dots$ We denote by $y_n$ a numerical estimate of the exact solution $y(t_n)$. Motivated by (3), we compute these estimates by the following recursive scheme

$$y_{n+1} = y_n + hf(t_n,y_n).$$	4

This is the Euler method (or forward Euler method, in contrast with the backward Euler method, to be described below). The method is named after Leonhard Euler who described it in 1768.

The Euler method is an example of an explicit method. This means that the new value $y_{n+1}$ is defined in terms of things that are already known, like $y_n$.

=== Backward Euler method ===
If, instead of (2), we use the approximation

$$y'(t) \approx \frac{y(t) - y(t-h)}{h},$$	5

we get the backward Euler method:

$$y_{n+1} = y_n + hf(t_{n+1},y_{n+1}).$$	6

The backward Euler method is an implicit method, meaning that we have to solve an equation to find $y_{n+1}$. One often uses fixed-point iteration or (some modification of) the Newton–Raphson method to achieve this.

It costs more time to solve this equation than explicit methods; this cost must be taken into consideration when one selects the method to use. The advantage of implicit methods such as (6) is that they are usually more stable for solving a stiff equation, meaning that a larger step size $h$ can be used.

=== First-order exponential integrator method ===
Exponential integrators describe a large class of integrators that have recently seen a lot of development. They date back to at least the 1960s.

In place of (1), we assume the differential equation is either of the form

$$y'(t) = -A\, y+ \mathcal{N}(y),$$	7

or it has been locally linearized about a background state to produce a linear term $-Ay$ and a nonlinear term $\mathcal{N}(y)$.

Exponential integrators are constructed by multiplying (7) by $e^{A t}$, and exactly integrating the result over a time interval $[t_n, t_{n+1}]$ where $t_{n+1} = t_n{+}h$:
$$y_{n+1} = e^{-A h } y_n + \int_0^h e^{ -(h-\tau) A } \mathcal{N}{\left( y\left( t_n+\tau \right) \right)}\, d\tau.$$
This integral equation is exact, but it does not define the integral.

The first-order exponential integrator can be obtained by approximating $\mathcal{N}( y( t_n+\tau ) )$ as a constant over the full interval, so that the integral can be evaluated:

$$y_{n+1} = e^{-Ah}y_n + A^{-1} \left(1-e^{-Ah}\right) \mathcal{N}{\left( y( t_n ) \right)}\ .$$	8

Exponential integrators are particularly useful for stiff differential equations where the stiffness lies in the linear term. The linear term is solved exactly, so it does not limit the step size. Higher order exponential integrators can be derived, either of multistep type or Runge-Kutta type.

=== Generalizations ===
The Euler method is often not accurate enough. In more precise terms, it only has order one (the concept of order is explained below). This caused mathematicians to look for higher-order methods.

One possibility is to use not only the previously computed value y_{n} to determine y_{n+1}, but to make the solution depend on more past values. This yields a so-called multistep method. Perhaps the simplest is the leapfrog method which is second order and (roughly speaking) relies on two time values.

Almost all practical multistep methods fall within the family of linear multistep methods, which have the form
$$\begin{align}
&{} \alpha_k y_{n+k} + \alpha_{k-1} y_{n+k-1} + \cdots + \alpha_0 y_n \\
&{} \quad = h \left[ \beta_k f(t_{n+k},y_{n+k}) + \beta_{k-1} f(t_{n+k-1},y_{n+k-1}) + \cdots + \beta_0 f(t_n,y_n) \right].
\end{align}$$

Another possibility is to use more points in the interval $[t_n,t_{n+1}]$. This leads to the family of Runge–Kutta methods, named after Carl Runge and Martin Kutta. One of their fourth-order methods is especially popular.

=== Advanced features ===
A good implementation of one of these methods for solving an ODE entails more than the time-stepping formula.

It is often inefficient to use the same step size all the time, so variable step-size methods have been developed. Usually, the step size is chosen such that the (local) error per step is below some tolerance level. This means that the methods must also compute an error indicator, an estimate of the local error.

An extension of this idea is to choose dynamically between different methods of different orders (this is called a variable order method). Methods based on Richardson extrapolation, such as the Bulirsch–Stoer algorithm, are often used to construct various methods of different orders.

Other desirable features include:

- dense output: cheap numerical approximations for the whole integration interval, and not only at the points t_{0}, t_{1}, t_{2}, ...
- event location: finding the times where, say, a particular function vanishes. This typically requires the use of a root-finding algorithm.
- support for parallel computing.
- when used for integrating with respect to time, time reversibility

=== Alternative methods ===
Many methods do not fall within the framework discussed here. Some classes of alternative methods are:

- multiderivative methods, which use not only the function f but also its derivatives. This class includes Hermite–Obreschkoff methods and Fehlberg methods, as well as methods like the Parker–Sochacki method or Bychkov–Scherbakov method, which compute the coefficients of the Taylor series of the solution y recursively.
- methods for second order ODEs. We said that all higher-order ODEs can be transformed to first-order ODEs of the form (1). While this is certainly true, it may not be the best way to proceed. In particular, Nyström methods work directly with second-order equations.
- geometric integration methods are especially designed for special classes of ODEs (for example, symplectic integrators for the solution of Hamiltonian equations). They take care that the numerical solution respects the underlying structure or geometry of these classes.

=== Parallel-in-time methods ===
Some IVPs require integration at such high temporal resolution and/or over such long time intervals that classical serial time-stepping methods become computationally infeasible to run in real-time (e.g. IVPs in numerical weather prediction, plasma modelling, and molecular dynamics). Parallel-in-time (PinT) methods have been developed in response to these issues in order to reduce simulation runtimes through the use of parallel computing.

Early PinT methods (the earliest being proposed in the 1960s) were initially overlooked by researchers due to the fact that the parallel computing architectures that they required were not yet widely available. With more computing power available, interest was renewed in the early 2000s with the development of Parareal, a flexible, easy-to-use PinT algorithm that is suitable for solving a wide variety of IVPs. The advent of exascale computing has meant that PinT algorithms are attracting increasing research attention and are being developed in such a way that they can harness the world's most powerful supercomputers. The most popular methods as of 2023 include Parareal, PFASST, ParaDiag, and MGRIT.

== Analysis ==
Numerical analysis is not only the design of numerical methods, but also their analysis. Three central concepts in this analysis are:

- convergence: whether the method approximates the solution,
- order: how well it approximates the solution, and
- stability: whether errors are damped out.

=== Convergence ===
A numerical method is said to be convergent if the numerical solution approaches the exact solution as the step size h goes to 0. More precisely, we require that for every ODE (1) with a Lipschitz function f and every t^{*} > 0,

$$\lim_{h\to0^+} \max_{n=0,1,\dots,\lfloor t^*/h\rfloor} \left\| y_{n,h} - y(t_n) \right\| = 0.$$

All the methods mentioned above are convergent.

=== Consistency and order ===
Suppose the numerical method is

$$y_{n+k} = \Psi(t_{n+k}; y_n, y_{n+1}, \dots, y_{n+k-1}; h). \,$$

The local (truncation) error of the method is the error committed by one step of the method. That is, it is the difference between the result given by the method, assuming that no error was made in earlier steps, and the exact solution:

$$\delta^h_{n+k} = \Psi{\left( t_{n+k}; y(t_n), y(t_{n+1}), \dots, y(t_{n+k-1}); h \right)} - y(t_{n+k}).$$

The method is said to be consistent if
$$\lim_{h\to 0} \frac{\delta^h_{n+k}}{h} = 0.$$
The method has order $p$ if
$$\delta^h_{n+k} = O(h^{p+1}) \quad\text{as } h\to0.$$
Hence a method is consistent if it has an order greater than 0. The (forward) Euler method (4) and the backward Euler method (6) introduced above both have order 1, so they are consistent. Most methods being used in practice attain higher order. Consistency is a necessary condition for convergence, but not sufficient; for a method to be convergent, it must be both consistent and zero-stable.

A related concept is the global (truncation) error, the error sustained in all the steps one needs to reach a fixed time $t$. Explicitly, the global error at time $t$ is $y_N - y(t)$ where $N = (t - t_0)/h$. The global error of a $p$-th order one-step method is $O(h^p)$; in particular, such a method is convergent. This statement is not necessarily true for multi-step methods.

=== Stability and stiffness ===
For some differential equations, application of standard methods—such as the Euler method, explicit Runge–Kutta methods, or multistep methods (for example, Adams–Bashforth methods)—exhibit instability in the solutions, though other methods may produce stable solutions. This "difficult behaviour" in the equation (which may not necessarily be complex itself) is described as stiffness, and is often caused by the presence of different time scales in the underlying problem. For example, a collision in a mechanical system like in an impact oscillator typically occurs at much smaller time scale than the time for the motion of objects; this discrepancy makes for very "sharp turns" in the curves of the state parameters.

Stiff problems are ubiquitous in chemical kinetics, control theory, solid mechanics, weather forecasting, biology, plasma physics, and electronics. One way to overcome stiffness is to extend the notion of differential equation to that of differential inclusion, which allows for and models non-smoothness. If the stiffness lies in a linear term, the difficulty can be avoided by using an exponential integrator, as discussed above.

== History ==
Below is a timeline of some important developments in this field.

- 1768 - Leonhard Euler publishes his method.
- 1824 - Augustin Louis Cauchy proves convergence of the Euler method. In this proof, Cauchy uses the implicit Euler method.
- 1855 - First mention of the multistep methods of John Couch Adams in a letter written by Francis Bashforth.
- 1895 - Carl Runge publishes the first Runge–Kutta method.
- 1901 - Martin Kutta describes the popular fourth-order Runge–Kutta method.
- 1910 - Lewis Fry Richardson announces his extrapolation method, Richardson extrapolation.
- 1952 - Charles F. Curtiss and Joseph Oakland Hirschfelder coin the term stiff equations.
- 1963 - Germund Dahlquist introduces A-stability of integration methods.

== Second-order boundary value problems ==
In a second-order boundary value problem (BVP) the conditions needed to solve the differential equation are given at two distinct values of the independent variable, rather than at a single point as is the case for an IVP.

One method for solving a BVP is the shooting method, in which the differential equation is treated as an IVP, starting from one of the end points, and solved repeatedly, using an iterative process, until the condition at the other end is satisfied.

Another common numerical method for BVPs is the discretisation method, described here. This involves solving numerically an approximately equivalent matrix problem obtained by discretizing the original BVP. The most commonly used method for numerically solving BVPs is called the Finite Difference Method. This method takes advantage of linear combinations of point values to construct finite difference coefficients that describe derivatives of the function. For example, the second-order central difference approximation to the first derivative is given by:

$$u'(x_i) = \frac{u_{i+1}-u_{i-1}}{2h} + \mathcal{O}(h^2),$$

and the second-order central difference for the second derivative is given by:

$$u''(x_i) = \frac{u_{i+1}- 2 u_i + u_{i-1}}{h^2} + \mathcal{O}(h^2).$$

In both of these formulae, $h=x_i-x_{i-1}$ is the distance between neighbouring $x$ values on the discretized domain. One then constructs a linear system that can then be solved by standard matrix methods. For example, suppose the equation to be solved is:

$$\begin{align}
&\frac{d^2 u}{dx^2} = u, \\[1ex]
&u(0)=0, \\
&u(1)=1.
\end{align}$$

The next step would be to discretize the problem and using the above approximation for the second derivative and solve the resulting system of linear equations. Choosing a number of intervals $n$ corresponds to a grid size $h=1/n$. This leads to a system of equations of the form:

$$\frac{u_{i+1} - 2u_i + u_{i-1}}{h^2}-u_i = 0, \quad  i={1,2,3,\dots,n-1}.$$

At $i = 1$ and $i=n-1$ there are terms involving the boundary values $u_0=u(0)=0$ and $u_n =u(1)=1$ and since these two values are known, one can simply substitute them into these equation and as a result have a non-homogeneous system of linear equations that can be solved.

In addition to the finite difference method described above, the discretisation of a BVP may be carried out using a Galerkin method or a spectral method. In some cases, spectral methods can be far more accurate than finite difference methods.

== See also ==
- Energy drift
- General linear methods
- List of numerical analysis topics#Numerical methods for ordinary differential equations
