= Zero stability =

Zero-stability, also known as D-stability in honor of Germund Dahlquist, refers to the stability of a numerical scheme applied to the simple initial value problem $y'(x) = 0$.

A linear multistep method is zero-stable if all roots of the characteristic equation that arises on applying the method to $y'(x) = 0$ have magnitude less than or equal to unity, and that all roots with unit magnitude are simple. This is called the root condition and means that the parasitic solutions of the recurrence relation will not grow exponentially.

== Example ==
The following third-order method has the highest order possible for any explicit two-step method for solving $y'(x) = f(x)$:
$$y_{n+2} + 4 y_{n+1} - 5y_n = h(4f_{n+1} + 2 f_n).$$
If $f(x)=0$ identically, this gives a linear recurrence relation with characteristic equation
$$r^2 + 4r - 5=(r-1)(r+5) = 0.$$
The roots of this equation are $r=1$ and $r=-5$ and so the general solution to the recurrence relation is $y_n = c_1\cdot 1^n + c_2 (-5)^n$. Rounding errors in the computation of $y_1$ would mean a nonzero (though small) value of $c_2$ so that eventually the parasitic solution $(-5)^n$ would dominate. Therefore, this method is not zero-stable.
