= Infinite difference method =

In mathematics, infinite difference methods are numerical methods for solving differential equations by approximating them with difference equations, in which infinite differences approximate the derivatives. In calculus there are two sections, one is differentiation and the other is integration. Integration is the reverse process of differentiation.

== See also ==
- Infinite element method
- Finite difference
- Finite difference time domain
