= Damping matrix =

Mathematical concept

In applied mathematics, a damping matrix is a matrix corresponding to any of certain systems of linear ordinary differential equations. A damping matrix is defined as follows. If the system has n degrees of freedom u_{n} and is under application of m damping forces. Each force can be expressed as follows:

$$f_{Di}=c_{i1} \dot{u_1}+c_{i2} \dot{u_2}+\cdots+c_{in} \dot{u_n}=\sum_{j=1}^n c_{i,j}\dot{u_j}$$

It yields in matrix form;

$$F_D=C \dot{U}$$

where C is the damping matrix composed by the damping coefficients:

$$C=(c_{i,j})_{1\le i\le n,1\le j\le m}$$
