= Germund Dahlquist =

Swedish mathematician (1925–2005)

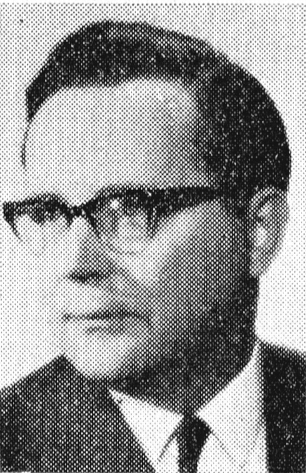
- Germund Dahlquist SPA (cropped)
- Born: 16 January 1925; Uppsala, Sweden
- Died: 8 February 2005 (aged 80); Stockholm, Sweden
- Education: Stockholm University
- Known for: Contributions to the theory of numerical analysis as applied to differential equations
- Scientific career
- Fields: Mathematics
- Workplaces: Royal Institute of Technology
- Doctoral advisor: Fritz Carlson; Lars Hörmander
- Other academic advisors: Harald Bohr
- Doctoral students: Gunilla Borgefors; Gunilla Kreiss

Germund Dahlquist (16 January 1925 – 8 February 2005) was a Swedish mathematician known primarily for his early contributions to the theory of numerical analysis as applied to differential equations.

Dahlquist began to study mathematics at Stockholm University in 1942 at the age of 17, where he cites the Danish mathematician Harald Bohr (who was living in exile after the occupation of Denmark during World War II) as a profound influence.

He received the degree of licentiat from Stockholm University in 1949, before taking a break from his studies to work at the Swedish Board of Computer Machinery (Matematikmaskinnämnden), working on (among other things) the early computer BESK, Sweden's first. During this time, he also worked with Carl-Gustaf Rossby on early numerical weather forecasts.

Dahlquist returned to Stockholm University to complete his Ph.D., Stability and Error Bounds in the Numerical Solution of Ordinary Differential Equations, which he defended in 1958, with Fritz Carlson and Lars Hörmander as his advisors. As part of this work he introduced the logarithmic norm (also introduced by Russian mathematician Sergei Lozinskii the same year).

In 1959 he moved to the Royal Institute of Technology (KTH), where he would later establish what became the Department of Numerical Analysis and Computer Science (NADA) in 1962 (now part of the School of Computer Science and Communication), and become Sweden's first Professor of Numerical Analysis in 1963. He helped establish the Nordic journal of numerical analysis, BIT, in 1961. In 1965 he was elected into the Royal Swedish Academy of Engineering Sciences (IVA).

The software package COMSOL Multiphysics, for finite element analysis of partial differential equations, was started by a couple of Dahlquist's graduate students based upon codes developed for a graduate course at KTH.

== See also ==
- First and second Dahlquist barriers

== Honors and awards ==
- SIAM 1988 John von Neumann lecturer.
- SIAM 1991 Peter Henrici Prize.
- SIAM Germund Dahlquist Prize, established 1995, "Awarded to a young scientist (normally under 45) for original contributions to fields associated with Germund Dahlquist, especially the numerical solution of differential equations and numerical methods for scientific computing".
- Three honorary doctorates, from Hamburg (1981), Helsinki (1994), and Linköping (1996).
