= List of Runge–Kutta methods =

Runge–Kutta methods are methods for the numerical solution of the ordinary differential equation

$$\frac{d y}{d t} = f(t, y).$$

Explicit Runge–Kutta methods take the form

$$\begin{align}
y_{n+1} &= y_n + h \sum_{i=1}^s b_i k_i \\
k_1 &= f(t_n, y_n),  \\
k_2 &= f(t_n+c_2h, y_n+h(a_{21}k_1)), \\
k_3 &= f(t_n+c_3h, y_n+h(a_{31}k_1+a_{32}k_2)), \\
&\;\;\vdots \\
k_i &= f\left(t_n + c_i h, y_n + h \sum_{j = 1}^{i-1} a_{ij} k_j\right).
\end{align}$$

Stages for implicit methods of s stages take the more general form, with the solution to be found over all s

$$k_i = f\left(t_n + c_i h, y_n + h \sum_{j = 1}^{s} a_{ij} k_j\right).$$

Each method listed on this page is defined by its Butcher tableau, which puts the coefficients of the method in a table as follows:

$$\begin{array}{c|cccc}
c_1    & a_{11} & a_{12}& \dots & a_{1s}\\
c_2    & a_{21} & a_{22}& \dots & a_{2s}\\
\vdots & \vdots & \vdots& \ddots& \vdots\\
c_s    & a_{s1} & a_{s2}& \dots & a_{ss} \\
\hline
& b_1    & b_2   & \dots & b_s\\
\end{array}$$

For adaptive and implicit methods, the Butcher tableau is extended to give values of $b^*_i$, and the estimated error is then

$$e_{n+1} = h\sum_{i=1}^s (b_i - b^*_i) k_i$$.

== Explicit methods ==
The explicit methods are those where the matrix $[a_{ij}]$ is lower triangular.

=== First-order methods ===
==== Forward Euler ====
The Euler method is first order. The lack of stability and accuracy limits its popularity mainly to use as a simple introductory example of a numeric solution method.

$$\begin{array}{c|c}
0 & 0 \\
\hline
& 1 \\
\end{array}$$

=== Second-order methods ===
==== Generic second-order method ====
Second-order methods can be generically written as follows:

$$\begin{array}{c|ccc}
0   & 0   & 0   \\
\alpha & \alpha & 0   \\
\hline
& 1-\frac{1}{2\alpha} & \frac{1}{2\alpha} \\
\end{array}$$

with α ≠ 0.

==== Explicit midpoint method ====
The (explicit) midpoint method is a second-order method with two stages (see also the implicit midpoint method below):

$$\begin{array}{c|cc}
0   & 0   & 0  \\
1/2 & 1/2 & 0  \\
\hline
& 0   & 1  \\
\end{array}$$

==== Heun's method ====
Heun's method is a second-order method with two stages. It is also known as the explicit trapezoid rule, improved Euler's method, or modified Euler's method:

$$\begin{array}{c|cc}
0   & 0   & 0  \\
1 & 1 & 0  \\
\hline
& 1/2 & 1/2  \\
\end{array}$$

==== Ralston's method ====
Ralston's method is a second-order method with two stages and a minimum local error bound:

$$\begin{array}{c|cc}
0   & 0   & 0  \\
2/3 & 2/3 & 0  \\
\hline
& 1/4   & 3/4  \\
\end{array}$$

=== Third-order methods ===
==== Generic third-order method ====
Third-order methods can be generically written as follows:

$$\begin{array}{c|ccc}
0      & 0      & 0  & 0\\
\alpha & \alpha & 0  & 0\\
\beta  &\frac{\beta}{\alpha}\frac{\beta-3\alpha(1-\alpha)}{(3\alpha-2)} & -\frac{\beta}{\alpha}\frac{\beta-\alpha}{(3\alpha-2)} & 0\\
\hline
& 1-\frac{3\alpha+3\beta-2}{6\alpha\beta} & \frac{3\beta-2}{6\alpha(\beta-\alpha)} & \frac{2-3\alpha}{6\beta(\beta-\alpha)} \\
\end{array}$$

with α ≠ 0, α ≠ 2/3, β ≠ 0, and α ≠ β.

==== Kutta's third-order method ====
$$\begin{array}{c|ccc}
0   & 0   & 0   & 0    \\
1/2 & 1/2 & 0   & 0    \\
1   & -1  & 2   & 0    \\
\hline
& 1/6 & 2/3 & 1/6  \\
\end{array}$$

==== Heun's third-order method ====
$$\begin{array}{c|ccc}
0   & 0   & 0   & 0    \\
1/3 & 1/3 & 0   & 0    \\
2/3 & 0   & 2/3 & 0   \\
\hline
& 1/4 & 0   & 3/4  \\
\end{array}$$

==== Ralston's third-order method ====
Ralston's third-order method has a minimum local error bound and is used in the embedded Bogacki–Shampine method.

$$\begin{array}{c|ccc}
0   & 0   & 0   & 0    \\
1/2 & 1/2 & 0   & 0    \\
3/4 & 0   & 3/4 & 0    \\
\hline
& 2/9 & 1/3 & 4/9  \\
\end{array}$$

==== Van der Houwen's/Wray's third-order method ====
$$\begin{array}{c|ccc}
0   & 0   & 0   & 0    \\
8/15 & 8/15 & 0   & 0    \\
2/3 & 1/4   & 5/12 & 0    \\
\hline
& 1/4 & 0   & 3/4  \\
\end{array}$$

==== Third-order Strong Stability Preserving Runge-Kutta (SSPRK3) ====
$$\begin{array}{c|ccc}
0   & 0   & 0   & 0    \\
1   & 1   & 0   & 0    \\
1/2 & 1/4 & 1/4 & 0    \\
\hline
& 1/6 & 1/6 & 2/3  \\
\end{array}$$

=== Fourth-order methods ===
==== Classic fourth-order method ====
The "original" Runge–Kutta method.

$$\begin{array}{c|cccc}
0   & 0   & 0   & 0   & 0\\
1/2 & 1/2 & 0   & 0   & 0\\
1/2 & 0   & 1/2 & 0   & 0\\
1   & 0   & 0   & 1   & 0\\
\hline
& 1/6 & 1/3 & 1/3 & 1/6\\
\end{array}$$

==== 3/8-rule fourth-order method ====
This method isn't as well known as the "classic" method, but is just as classic because it was proposed in the same paper (Kutta, 1901).

$$\begin{array}{c|cccc}
0   & 0   & 0   & 0   & 0\\
1/3 & 1/3 & 0   & 0   & 0\\
2/3 & -1/3   & 1 & 0   & 0\\
1   & 1   & -1   & 1   & 0\\
\hline
& 1/8 & 3/8 & 3/8 & 1/8\\
\end{array}$$

==== Ralston's fourth-order method ====
This fourth order method has minimum truncation error.

$$\begin{array}{c|cccc}
0   & 0   & 0   & 0   & 0\\
\frac{2}{5} & \frac{2}{5} & 0   & 0   & 0\\
\frac{14 - 3 \sqrt{5}}{16} & \frac{-2\,889 + 1\,428\sqrt{5}}{1\,024}   & \frac{3\,785 - 1\,620\sqrt{5}}{1\,024} & 0   & 0\\
1   & \frac{-3\,365 + 2\,094\sqrt{5}}{6\,040}   & \frac{-975 - 3\,046\sqrt{5}}{2\,552}   & \frac{467\,040 + 203\,968\sqrt{5}}{240\,845}   & 0\\
\hline
& \frac{263 + 24\sqrt{5}}{1\,812} & \frac{125 - 1000\sqrt{5}}{3\,828} & \frac{3\,426\,304 + 1\,661\,952\sqrt{5}}{5\,924\,787} & \frac{30 - 4\sqrt{5}}{123}\\
\end{array}$$

=== Fifth-order methods ===
==== Nyström's fifth-order method ====
This fifth-order method was a correction of the one proposed originally by Kutta's work.

$\begin{array}{c|cccccc} 0 & 0 & 0 & 0 & 0 & 0 & 0\\ \frac{1}{3} & \frac{1}{3} & 0 & 0 & 0 & 0 & 0\\ \frac{2}{5} & \frac{4}{25} & \frac{6}{25} & 0 & 0 & 0 & 0\\ 1 & \frac{1}{4} & -3 & \frac{15}{4} & 0 & 0 & 0\\ \frac{2}{3} & \frac{2}{27} & \frac{10}{9} & -\frac{50}{81} & \frac{8}{81} & 0 & 0\\ \frac{4}{5} & \frac{2}{25} & \frac{12}{25} & \frac{2}{15} & \frac{8}{75} & 0 & 0\\ \hline & \frac{23}{192} & 0 & \frac{125}{192} & 0 & -\frac{27}{64} & \frac{125}{192}\\ \end{array}$

== Embedded methods ==
The embedded methods are designed to produce an estimate of the local truncation error of a single Runge–Kutta step, and as result, allow to control the error with adaptive stepsize. This is done by having two methods in the tableau, one with order p and one with order p-1.

The lower-order step is given by

$$y^*_{n+1} = y_n + h\sum_{i=1}^s b^*_i k_i,$$

where the $k_i$ are the same as for the higher order method. Then the error is

$$e_{n+1} = y_{n+1} - y^*_{n+1} = h\sum_{i=1}^s (b_i - b^*_i) k_i,$$

which is $O(h^p)$. The Butcher Tableau for this kind of method is extended to give the values of $b^*_i$

$$\begin{array}{c|cccc}
c_1    & a_{11} & a_{12}& \dots & a_{1s}\\
c_2    & a_{21} & a_{22}& \dots & a_{2s}\\
\vdots & \vdots & \vdots& \ddots& \vdots\\
c_s    & a_{s1} & a_{s2}& \dots & a_{ss} \\
\hline
& b_1    & b_2   & \dots & b_s\\
& b_1^*    & b_2^*   & \dots & b_s^*\\
\end{array}$$

=== Heun–Euler ===
The simplest adaptive Runge–Kutta method involves combining Heun's method, which is order 2, with the Euler method, which is order 1. Its extended Butcher Tableau is:

$$\begin{array}{c|cc}
0&\\
1& 	1 \\
\hline
&	1/2& 	1/2\\
&	1 &	0
\end{array}$$

The error estimate is used to control the stepsize.

=== Fehlberg RK1(2) ===
The Fehlberg method has two methods of orders 1 and 2. Its extended Butcher Tableau is:

0
1/2	1/2
1	1/256	255/256
	1/512	255/256	1/512
	1/256	255/256	0

The first row of b coefficients gives the second-order accurate solution, and the second row has order one.

=== Bogacki–Shampine ===
The Bogacki–Shampine method has two methods of orders 2 and 3. Its extended Butcher Tableau is:

0
1/2	1/2
3/4	0	3/4
1	2/9	1/3	4/9
	2/9	1/3	4/9	0
	7/24	1/4	1/3	1/8

The first row of b coefficients gives the third-order accurate solution, and the second row has order two.

=== Fehlberg ===
The Runge–Kutta–Fehlberg method has two methods of orders 5 and 4; it is sometimes called RKF45 . Its extended Butcher Tableau is:

$$\begin{array}{r|ccccc}
0 & & & & & \\
1 / 4 & 1 / 4 & & & \\
3 / 8 & 3 / 32 & 9 / 32 & & \\
12 / 13 & 1932 / 2197 & -7200 / 2197 & 7296 / 2197 & \\
1 & 439 / 216 & -8 & 3680 / 513 & -845 / 4104 & \\
1 / 2 & -8 / 27 & 2 & -3544 / 2565 & 1859 / 4104 & -11 / 40 \\
\hline & 16 / 135 & 0 & 6656 / 12825 & 28561 / 56430 & -9 / 50 & 2 / 55 \\
& 25 / 216 & 0 & 1408 / 2565 & 2197 / 4104 & -1 / 5 & 0
\end{array}$$

The first row of b coefficients gives the fifth-order accurate solution, and the second row has order four. The coefficients here allow for an adaptive stepsize to be determined automatically.

=== Cash-Karp ===
Cash and Karp have modified Fehlberg's original idea. The extended tableau for the Cash–Karp method is

0
1/5	1/5
3/10	3/40	9/40
3/5	3/10	−9/10	6/5
1	−11/54	5/2	−70/27	35/27
7/8	1631/55296	175/512	575/13824	44275/110592	253/4096
	37/378	0	250/621	125/594	0	512/1771
	2825/27648	0	18575/48384	13525/55296	277/14336	1/4

The first row of b coefficients gives the fifth-order accurate solution, and the second row has order four.

=== Dormand–Prince ===
The extended tableau for the Dormand–Prince method is

0
1/5	1/5
3/10	3/40	9/40
4/5	44/45	−56/15	32/9
8/9	19372/6561	−25360/2187	64448/6561	−212/729
1	9017/3168	−355/33	46732/5247	49/176	−5103/18656
1	35/384	0	500/1113	125/192	−2187/6784	11/84
	35/384	0	500/1113	125/192	−2187/6784	11/84	0
	5179/57600	0	7571/16695	393/640	−92097/339200	187/2100	1/40

The first row of b coefficients gives the fifth-order accurate solution, and the second row gives the fourth-order accurate solution.

== Implicit methods ==
=== Backward Euler ===
The backward Euler method is first order. Unconditionally stable and non-oscillatory for linear diffusion problems.

$$\begin{array}{c|c}
1 & 1 \\
\hline
& 1 \\
\end{array}$$

=== Implicit midpoint ===
The implicit midpoint method is of second order. It is the simplest method in the class of collocation methods known as the Gauss-Legendre methods. It is a symplectic integrator.

$$\begin{array}{c|c}
1/2 & 1/2 \\
\hline
& 1
\end{array}$$

=== Crank-Nicolson method ===
The Crank–Nicolson method corresponds to the implicit trapezoidal rule and is a second-order accurate and A-stable method.

$$\begin{array}{c|cc}
0   & 0   & 0   \\
1   & 1/2 & 1/2 \\
\hline
& 1/2 & 1/2 \\
\end{array}$$

=== Gauss–Legendre methods ===
These methods are based on the points of Gauss–Legendre quadrature. The Gauss–Legendre method of order four has Butcher tableau:

$$\begin{array}{c|cc}
\frac{1}{2}-\frac{\sqrt3}{6} & \frac{1}{4} & \frac{1}{4}-\frac{\sqrt3}{6}  \\
\frac{1}{2}+\frac{\sqrt3}{6}  & \frac{1}{4}+\frac{\sqrt3}{6} &\frac{1}{4} \\
\hline
& \frac{1}{2} & \frac{1}{2}\\
& \frac12+\frac{\sqrt3}{2} & \frac12-\frac{\sqrt3}{2} \\
\end{array}$$

The Gauss–Legendre method of order six has Butcher tableau:

$$\begin{array}{c|ccc}
\frac{1}{2} - \frac{\sqrt{15}}{10}   & \frac{5}{36} &  \frac{2}{9}- \frac{\sqrt{15}}{15} & \frac{5}{36} - \frac{\sqrt{15}}{30} \\
\frac{1}{2} & \frac{5}{36} + \frac{\sqrt{15}}{24} & \frac{2}{9} & \frac{5}{36} - \frac{\sqrt{15}}{24}\\
\frac{1}{2} + \frac{\sqrt{15}}{10} & \frac{5}{36} + \frac{\sqrt{15}}{30} & \frac{2}{9} + \frac{\sqrt{15}}{15} & \frac{5}{36}  \\
\hline
& \frac{5}{18} & \frac{4}{9} & \frac{5}{18}  \\
& -\frac56 & \frac83 & -\frac56
\end{array}$$

=== Diagonally Implicit Runge–Kutta methods ===
Diagonally Implicit Runge–Kutta (DIRK) formulae have been widely used for the numerical solution of stiff initial value problems; the advantage of this approach is that here the solution may be found sequentially as opposed to simultaneously.

The simplest method from this class is the order 2 implicit midpoint method.

Kraaijevanger and Spijker's two-stage Diagonally Implicit Runge–Kutta method:

$$\begin{array}{c|cc}
1/2  &  1/2   &  0    \\
3/2  &  -1/2  &  2    \\
\hline
&  -1/2  &  3/2  \\
\end{array}$$

Qin and Zhang's two-stage, 2nd order, symplectic Diagonally Implicit Runge–Kutta method:

$$\begin{array}{c|cc}
1/4  &  1/4  &  0    \\
3/4  &  1/2  &  1/4  \\
\hline
&  1/2  &  1/2  \\
\end{array}$$

Pareschi and Russo's two-stage 2nd order Diagonally Implicit Runge–Kutta method:

$$\begin{array}{c|cc}
x      &  x           &  0  \\
1 - x  &  1 - 2x      &  x  \\
\hline
& \frac{1}{2}  & \frac{1}{2}\\
\end{array}$$

This Diagonally Implicit Runge–Kutta method is A-stable if and only if $x \ge \frac{1}{4}$. Moreover, this method is L-stable if and only if $x$ equals one of the roots of the polynomial $x^2 - 2x + \frac{1}{2}$, i.e. if $x = 1 \pm \frac{\sqrt2}{2}$. Qin and Zhang's Diagonally Implicit Runge–Kutta method corresponds to Pareschi and Russo's Diagonally Implicit Runge–Kutta method with $x = 1/4$.

Two-stage 2nd order Diagonally Implicit Runge–Kutta method:

$$\begin{array}{c|cc}
x   &  x           &  0  \\
1   &  1 - x       &  x  \\
\hline
& 1 - x  & x\\
\end{array}$$

Again, this Diagonally Implicit Runge–Kutta method is A-stable if and only if $x \ge \frac{1}{4}$. As the previous method, this method is again L-stable if and only if $x$ equals one of the roots of the polynomial $x^2 - 2x + \frac{1}{2}$, i.e. if $x = 1 \pm \frac{\sqrt2}{2}$. This condition is also necessary for 2nd order accuracy.

Crouzeix's two-stage, 3rd order Diagonally Implicit Runge–Kutta method:

$$\begin{array}{c|cc}
\frac{1}{2}+\frac{\sqrt3}{6}  &  \frac{1}{2}+\frac{\sqrt3}{6}  &  0                             \\
\frac{1}{2}-\frac{\sqrt3}{6}  &  -\frac{\sqrt3}{3}             &  \frac{1}{2}+\frac{\sqrt3}{6}  \\
\hline
& \frac{1}{2}                    & \frac{1}{2}\\
\end{array}$$

Crouzeix's three-stage, 4th order Diagonally Implicit Runge–Kutta method:

$$\begin{array}{c|ccc}
\frac{1+\alpha}{2} & \frac{1+\alpha}{2} & 0                  & 0  \\
\frac{1}{2}        & -\frac{\alpha}{2}  & \frac{1+\alpha}{2} & 0  \\
\frac{1-\alpha}{2} & 1+\alpha           & -(1+2\,\alpha)     & \frac{1+\alpha}{2} \\\hline
& \frac{1}{6\alpha^2} & 1 - \frac{1}{3\alpha^2} & \frac{1}{6\alpha^2}\\
\end{array}$$

with $\alpha = \frac{2}{\sqrt3}\cos{\frac{\pi}{18}}$.

Three-stage, 3rd order, L-stable Diagonally Implicit Runge–Kutta method:

$$\begin{array}{c|ccc}
x              &  x               &  0              &  0   \\
\frac{1+x}{2}  &  \frac{1-x}{2}   &  x              &  0   \\
1              &  -3x^2/2+4x-1/4  &  3x^2/2-5x+5/4  &  x   \\
\hline
&  -3x^2/2+4x-1/4  &  3x^2/2-5x+5/4  &  x   \\
\end{array}$$

with $x = 0.4358665215$

Nørsett's three-stage, 4th order Diagonally Implicit Runge–Kutta method has the following Butcher tableau:

$$\begin{array}{c|ccc}
x    &  x      &  0     &  0   \\
1/2  &  1/2-x  &  x     &  0   \\
1-x  &  2x     &  1-4x  &  x   \\
\hline
& \frac{1}{6(1-2x)^2}  & \frac{3(1-2x)^2 - 1}{3(1-2x)^2} & \frac{1}{6(1-2x)^2} \\
\end{array}$$

with $x$ one of the three roots of the cubic equation $x^3 -3x^2/2 + x/2 - 1/24 = 0$. The three roots of this cubic equation are approximately $x_1 = \frac{1}{2} + \frac{1}{\sqrt{3}} \cos\frac{\pi}{18} = 1.068579021301629$, $x_2 = 0.1288864005157204$, and $x_3 = 0.3025345781826508$. The root $x_1$ gives the best stability properties for initial value problems.

Four-stage, 3rd order, L-stable Diagonally Implicit Runge–Kutta method

$$\begin{array}{c|cccc}
1/2  &  1/2   &  0     &  0    &  0    \\
2/3  &  1/6   &  1/2   &  0    &  0    \\
1/2  &  -1/2  &  1/2   &  1/2  &  0    \\
1    &  3/2   &  -3/2  &  1/2  &  1/2  \\
\hline
&  3/2   &  -3/2  &  1/2  &  1/2  \\
\end{array}$$

=== Lobatto methods ===
There are three main families of Lobatto methods, called IIIA, IIIB and IIIC (in classical mathematical literature, the symbols I and II are reserved for two types of Radau methods). These are named after Rehuel Lobatto as a reference to the Lobatto quadrature rule, but were introduced by Byron L. Ehle in his thesis. All are implicit methods, have order 2s − 2 and they all have c_{1} = 0 and c_{s} = 1. Unlike any explicit method, it's possible for these methods to have the order greater than the number of stages. Lobatto lived before the classic fourth-order method was popularized by Runge and Kutta.

==== Lobatto IIIA methods ====
The Lobatto IIIA methods are collocation methods. The second-order method is known as the trapezoidal rule:

$$\begin{array}{c|cc}
0   & 0   & 0  \\
1   & 1/2 & 1/2\\
\hline
& 1/2 & 1/2\\
& 1 & 0 \\
\end{array}$$

The fourth-order method is given by

$$\begin{array}{c|ccc}
0   & 0   & 0   & 0    \\
1/2 & 5/24& 1/3 & -1/24\\
1   & 1/6 & 2/3 & 1/6  \\
\hline
& 1/6 & 2/3 & 1/6  \\
& -\frac12 & 2 & -\frac12 \\
\end{array}$$

These methods are A-stable, but neither L-stable nor B-stable.

==== Lobatto IIIB methods ====
The Lobatto IIIB methods are not collocation methods, but they can be viewed as discontinuous collocation methods (Hairer, Lubich & Wanner 2006, §II.1.4). The second-order method is given by

$$\begin{array}{c|cc}
0   & 1/2 & 0  \\
1   & 1/2 & 0  \\
\hline
& 1/2 & 1/2\\
& 1 & 0 \\
\end{array}$$

The fourth-order method is given by

$$\begin{array}{c|ccc}
0   & 1/6 & -1/6& 0    \\
1/2 & 1/6 & 1/3 & 0    \\
1   & 1/6 & 5/6 & 0    \\
\hline
& 1/6 & 2/3 & 1/6  \\
& -\frac12 & 2 & -\frac12 \\
\end{array}$$

Lobatto IIIB methods are A-stable, but neither L-stable nor B-stable.

==== Lobatto IIIC methods ====
The Lobatto IIIC methods also are discontinuous collocation methods. The second-order method is given by

$$\begin{array}{c|cc}
0   & 1/2 & -1/2\\
1   & 1/2 & 1/2 \\
\hline
& 1/2 & 1/2 \\
& 1 & 0 \\
\end{array}$$

The fourth-order method is given by

$$\begin{array}{c|ccc}
0   & 1/6 & -1/3& 1/6  \\
1/2 & 1/6 & 5/12& -1/12\\
1   & 1/6 & 2/3 & 1/6  \\
\hline
& 1/6 & 2/3 & 1/6  \\
& -\frac12 & 2 & -\frac12 \\
\end{array}$$

They are L-stable. They are also algebraically stable and thus B-stable, which makes them suitable for stiff problems.

==== Lobatto IIIC* methods ====
The Lobatto IIIC* methods are also known as Lobatto III methods (Butcher, 2008), Butcher's Lobatto methods (Hairer et al., 1993), and Lobatto IIIC methods (Sun, 2000) in the literature. The second-order method is given by

$$\begin{array}{c|cc}
0   & 0 & 0\\
1   & 1 & 0 \\
\hline
& 1/2 & 1/2 \\
\end{array}$$

Butcher's three-stage, fourth-order method is given by

$$\begin{array}{c|ccc}
0   & 0 & 0 & 0  \\
1/2 & 1/4 & 1/4 & 0\\
1   & 0 & 1 & 0  \\
\hline
& 1/6 & 2/3 & 1/6  \\
\end{array}$$

These methods are not A-stable, B-stable or L-stable. The Lobatto IIIC* method for $s = 2$ is sometimes called the explicit trapezoidal rule.

==== Generalized Lobatto methods ====
One can consider a very general family of methods with three real parameters $(\alpha_{A},\alpha_{B},\alpha_{C})$ by considering Lobatto coefficients of the form

$$a_{i,j}(\alpha_{A},\alpha_{B},\alpha_{C}) = \alpha_{A}a_{i,j}^A + \alpha_{B}a_{i,j}^B + \alpha_{C}a_{i,j}^C + \alpha_{C*}a_{i,j}^{C*}$$,

where

$$\alpha_{C*} = 1 - \alpha_{A} - \alpha_{B} - \alpha_{C}$$.

For example, Lobatto IIID family introduced in (Nørsett and Wanner, 1981), also called Lobatto IIINW, are given by

$$\begin{array}{c|cc}
0   & 1/2 & 1/2\\
1   & -1/2 & 1/2 \\
\hline
& 1/2 & 1/2 \\
\end{array}$$

and

$$\begin{array}{c|ccc}
0   & 1/6 & 0 & -1/6  \\
1/2 & 1/12 & 5/12 & 0\\
1   & 1/2 & 1/3 & 1/6  \\
\hline
& 1/6 & 2/3 & 1/6  \\
\end{array}$$

These methods correspond to $\alpha_{A} = 2$, $\alpha_{B} = 2$, $\alpha_{C} = -1$, and $\alpha_{C*} = -2$. The methods are L-stable. They are algebraically stable and thus B-stable.

=== Radau methods ===
Radau methods are fully implicit methods (matrix A of such methods can have any structure). Radau methods attain order 2s − 1 for s stages. Radau methods are A-stable, but expensive to implement. Also they can suffer from order reduction.

==== Radau IA methods ====
The first order method is similar to the backward Euler method and given by

$$\begin{array}{c|cc}
0   & 1    \\
\hline
& 1 \\
\end{array}$$

The third-order method is given by

$$\begin{array}{c|cc}
0   & 1/4  & -1/4  \\
2/3 & 1/4  &  5/12 \\
\hline
& 1/4 & 3/4 \\
\end{array}$$

The fifth-order method is given by

$$\begin{array}{c|ccc}
0   & \frac{1}{9} & \frac{-1 - \sqrt{6}}{18} & \frac{-1 + \sqrt{6}}{18} \\
\frac{3}{5} - \frac{\sqrt{6}}{10}  & \frac{1}{9} & \frac{11}{45} + \frac{7\sqrt{6}}{360} & \frac{11}{45} - \frac{43\sqrt{6}}{360}\\
\frac{3}{5} + \frac{\sqrt{6}}{10} & \frac{1}{9} & \frac{11}{45} + \frac{43\sqrt{6}}{360} & \frac{11}{45} - \frac{7\sqrt{6}}{360}  \\
\hline
& \frac{1}{9} & \frac{4}{9} + \frac{\sqrt{6}}{36} & \frac{4}{9} - \frac{\sqrt{6}}{36}  \\
\end{array}$$

==== Radau IIA methods ====
The c_{i} of this method are zeros of

$$\frac{d^{s-1}}{dx^{s-1}}(x^{s-1}(x-1)^s)$$.

The first-order method is equivalent to the backward Euler method.

The third-order method is given by

$$\begin{array}{c|cc}
1/3 & 5/12 & -1/12\\
1   & 3/4  &  1/4 \\
\hline
& 3/4 & 1/4 \\
\end{array}$$

The fifth-order method is given by

$$\begin{array}{c|ccc}
\frac{2}{5} - \frac{\sqrt{6}}{10}   & \frac{11}{45} - \frac{7\sqrt{6}}{360} & \frac{37}{225} - \frac{169\sqrt{6}}{1800} & -\frac{2}{225} + \frac{\sqrt{6}}{75} \\
\frac{2}{5} + \frac{\sqrt{6}}{10}  & \frac{37}{225} + \frac{169\sqrt{6}}{1800} & \frac{11}{45} + \frac{7\sqrt{6}}{360} & -\frac{2}{225} - \frac{\sqrt{6}}{75}\\
1                   & \frac{4}{9} - \frac{\sqrt{6}}{36} & \frac{4}{9} + \frac{\sqrt{6}}{36} & \frac{1}{9}  \\
\hline
& \frac{4}{9} - \frac{\sqrt{6}}{36} & \frac{4}{9} + \frac{\sqrt{6}}{36} & \frac{1}{9}  \\
\end{array}$$
