= Bogacki =

Bogacki (feminine: Bogacka, plural: Bogaccy) is a surname of Polish origin. Due to its pronunciation ('c' is pronounced 'ts' in Polish), it is sometimes respelled as Bogatski or Bogatzki. People with the surname include:

- Henry Bogacki (1912–2007), American football player
- Przemysław Bogacki, Polish mathematician
- Sylwia Bogacka (born 1981), Polish sports shooter
- Dieter Bogatzki (1942–2000), German middle-distance runner

== See also ==
- Bogacki–Shampine method
