= RKF =

RKF may refer to:

- Runge–Kutta–Fehlberg method in mathematics
- Reich Commissioner for the Consolidation of German Nationhood (Reichskommissar für die Festigung deutschen Volkstums)
