= Rehuel Lobatto =

Dutch mathematician (1797–1866)

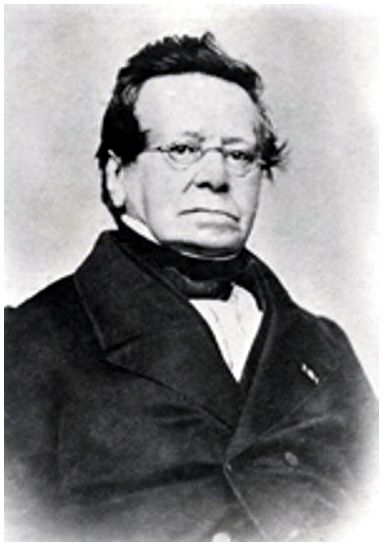
Rehuel Lobatto

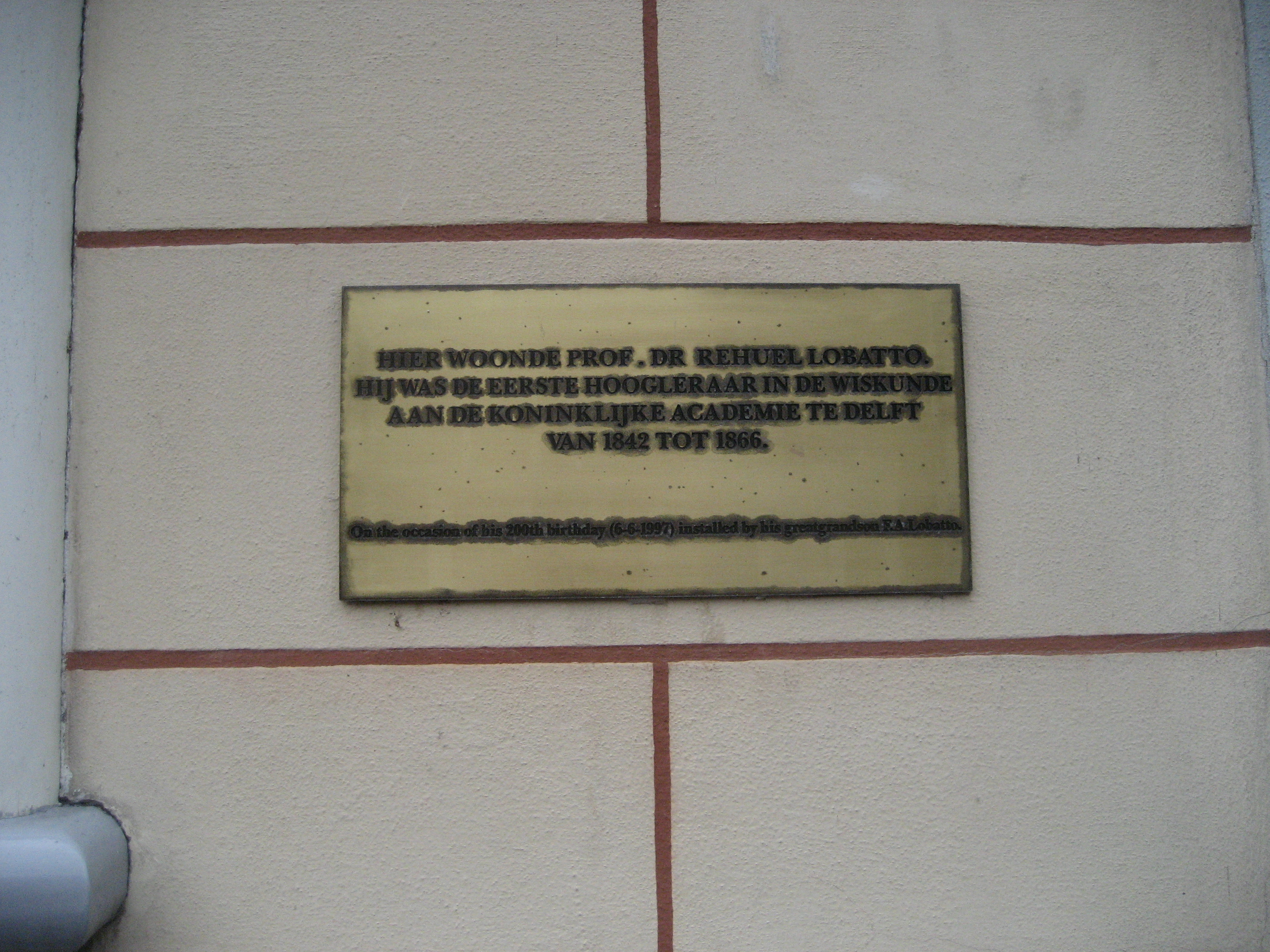
Plaque in Delft

Rehuel Lobatto (6 June 1797 – 9 February 1866 ) was a Dutch mathematician. The Gauss-Lobatto quadrature method is named after him, as are his variants on the Runge–Kutta methods for solving ODEs, and the Lobatto polynomials. He was the author of a great number of articles in scientific periodicals, as well as various schoolbooks.

Lobatto was born in Amsterdam to a Portuguese Jewish family. As a schoolboy Lobatto already displayed remarkable talent for mathematics. He studied mathematics under Jean Henri van Swinden at the Athenaeum Illustre of Amsterdam, earning his BA in 1812; and then with Adolphe Quetelet (coediting a volume of "Correspondance Mathématique et Physique").

Working for the Dutch government - initially for the Ministry of the Interior - he became secretary of a statistical commission in 1831. From 1826 till 1849 he was editor of the "Jaarboekje van Lobatto", as those editions of the official annual of statistics came to be known. In 1841 he was appointed by Minister Rochussen as a member of a commission for the conversion of the public debt. In 1842 he was appointed Professor of Higher Mathematics at the Polytechnical School of Delft, remaining there until his final years.

In 1836 he became member of the Royal Institute, predecessor of the Royal Netherlands Academy of Arts and Sciences. The Order of the Netherlands Lion was conferred upon him; he received his Doctoral degree honoris causa from Groningen University.
