= Cash–Karp method =

Method for solving ordinary differential equations

In numerical analysis, the Cash–Karp method is a method for solving ordinary differential equations (ODEs). It was proposed by Professor Jeff R. Cash from Imperial College London and Alan H. Karp from IBM Scientific Center. The method is a member of the Runge–Kutta family of ODE solvers. More specifically, it uses six function evaluations to calculate fourth- and fifth-order accurate solutions. The difference between these solutions is then taken to be the error of the (fourth order) solution. This error estimate is very convenient for adaptive stepsize integration algorithms. Other similar integration methods are Fehlberg (RKF) and Dormand–Prince (RKDP).

The Butcher tableau is:

0
1/5	1/5
3/10	3/40	9/40
3/5	3/10	−9/10	6/5
1	−11/54	5/2	−70/27	35/27
7/8	1631/55296	175/512	575/13824	44275/110592	253/4096
	37/378	0	250/621	125/594	0	512/1771
	2825/27648	0	18575/48384	13525/55296	277/14336	1/4

The first row of b coefficients gives the fifth-order accurate solution, and the second row gives the fourth-order solution.

== See also ==
- Adaptive Runge–Kutta methods
- List of Runge–Kutta methods
