= L-stability =

Stability property of some Runge–Kutta methods

Within mathematics regarding differential equations, L-stability is a special case of A-stability, a property of Runge–Kutta methods for solving ordinary differential equations. A method is L-stable if it is A-stable and $\phi(z) \to 0$ as $z \to \infty$, where $\phi$ is the stability function of the method (the stability function of a Runge–Kutta method is a rational function and thus the limit as $z \to +\infty$ is the same as the limit as $z \to -\infty$). L-stable methods are in general very good at integrating stiff equations.
