= Runge–Kutta method (SDE) =

In mathematics of stochastic systems, the Runge–Kutta method is a technique for the approximate numerical solution of a stochastic differential equation. It is a generalisation of the Runge–Kutta method for ordinary differential equations to stochastic differential equations (SDEs). Importantly, the method does not involve knowing derivatives of the coefficient functions in the SDEs.

== Most basic scheme ==
Consider the Itō diffusion $X$ satisfying the following Itō stochastic differential equation
$$dX_t = a(X_t) \, dt + b(X_t) \, dW_t,$$
with initial condition $X_0=x_0$, where $W_t$ stands for the Wiener process, and suppose that we wish to solve this SDE on some interval of time $[0,T]$. Then the basic Runge–Kutta approximation to the true solution $X$ is the Markov chain $Y$ defined as follows:

- partition the interval $[0,T]$ into $N$ subintervals of width $\delta=T/N > 0$:
  $$0 = \tau_{0} < \tau_{1} < \dots < \tau_{N} = T;$$
- set $Y_0 := x_0$;
- recursively compute $Y_n$ for $1\leq n\leq N$ by
  $$Y_{n + 1} := Y_{n} + a(Y_{n}) \delta + b(Y_{n}) \Delta W_{n} + \frac{1}{2} \left( b(\hat{\Upsilon}_{n}) - b(Y_{n}) \right) \left( (\Delta W_{n})^{2} - \delta \right) \delta^{-1/2},$$
  where $\Delta W_{n} = W_{\tau_{n + 1}} - W_{\tau_{n}}$ and $\hat{\Upsilon}_{n} = Y_{n} + a(Y_n) \delta + b(Y_{n}) \delta^{1/2}.$

The random variables $\Delta W_{n}$ are independent and identically distributed normal random variables with expected value zero and variance $\delta$.

This scheme has strong order 1, meaning that the approximation error of the actual solution at a fixed time scales with the time step $\delta$. It has also weak order 1, meaning that the error on the statistics of the solution scales with the time step $\delta$. See the references for complete and exact statements.

The functions $a$ and $b$ can be time-varying without any complication. The method can be generalized to the case of several coupled equations; the principle is the same but the equations become longer.

== Variation of the Improved Euler is flexible ==
A newer Runge—Kutta scheme also of strong order 1 straightforwardly reduces to the improved Euler scheme for deterministic ODEs. Consider the vector stochastic process $\vec X(t)\in \mathbb R^n$ that satisfies the general Ito SDE
$$d\vec X=\vec a(t,\vec X)\,dt+\vec b(t,\vec X)\,dW,$$
where drift $\vec a$ and volatility $\vec b$ are sufficiently smooth functions of their arguments. Given time step $h$, and given the value $\vec X(t_k) = \vec X_k$, estimate $\vec X(t_{k+1})$ by $\vec X_{k+1}$ for time $t_{k+1}=t_k+h$ via
$$\begin{array}{l}
\vec K_1=h\vec a(t_k,\vec X_k)+(\Delta W_k-S_k\sqrt h)\vec b(t_k,\vec X_k),
\\
\vec K_2=h\vec a(t_{k+1},\vec X_k+\vec K_1)+(\Delta W_k+S_k\sqrt h)\vec b(t_{k+1},\vec X_k+\vec K_1),
\\
\vec X_{k+1}=\vec X_k+\frac12(\vec K_1+\vec K_2),
\end{array}$$

- where $\Delta W_k=\sqrt hZ_k$ for normal random $Z_k\sim N(0,1)$;
- and where $S_k=\pm1$, each alternative chosen with probability $1/2$.

The above describes only one time step. Repeat this time step $(t_m-t_0)/h$ times in order to integrate the SDE from time $t=t_0$ to $t=t_m$.

The scheme integrates Stratonovich SDEs to $O(h)$ provided one sets $S_k=0$ throughout (instead of choosing $\pm 1$).

== Higher order Runge-Kutta schemes ==
Higher-order schemes also exist, but become increasingly complex. Rößler developed many schemes for Ito SDEs, whereas Komori developed schemes for Stratonovich SDEs. Rackauckas extended these schemes to allow for adaptive-time stepping via Rejection Sampling with Memory (RSwM), resulting in orders of magnitude efficiency increases in practical biological models, along with coefficient optimization for improved stability.
