= Runge–Kutta–Fehlberg method =

Algorithm in numerical analysis

In mathematics, the Runge–Kutta–Fehlberg method (or Fehlberg method) is an algorithm in numerical analysis for the numerical solution of ordinary differential equations. It was developed by the German mathematician Erwin Fehlberg and is based on the large class of Runge–Kutta methods.

The novelty of Fehlberg's method is that it is an embedded method from the Runge–Kutta family, meaning that it reuses the same intermediate calculations to produce two estimates of different accuracy, allowing for automatic error estimation. The method presented in Fehlberg's 1969 paper has been dubbed the RKF45 method, and is a method of order O(h^{4}) with an error estimator of order O(h^{5}). By performing one extra calculation, the error in the solution can be estimated and controlled by using the higher-order embedded method that allows for an adaptive stepsize to be determined automatically.

== Butcher tableau for Fehlberg's 4(5) method ==
Any Runge–Kutta method is uniquely identified by its Butcher tableau. The embedded pair proposed by Fehlberg:

Coefficients for RK4(5), Formula 2 (Fehlberg)
κ	α_{κ}	β_{κλ}					c_{κ} (4th order)	ĉ_{κ} (5th order)
κ	α_{κ}	λ=0	λ=1	λ=2	λ=3	λ=4	c_{κ} (4th order)	ĉ_{κ} (5th order)
0	0	0					25/216	16/135
1	1/4	1/4					0	0
2	3/8	3/32	9/32				1408/2565	6656/12825
3	12/13	1932/2197	−7200/2197	7296/2197			2197/4104	28561/56430
4	1	439/216	−8	3680/513	−845/4104		−1/5	−9/50
5	1/2	−8/27	2	−3544/2565	1859/4104	−11/40		2/55

This shows the computational time in real time used during a 3-body simulation evolved with the Runge-Kutta-Fehlberg method. Most of the computer time is spent when the bodies pass close by and are susceptible to numerical error.

== Implementing an RK4(5) Algorithm ==
The coefficients found by Fehlberg for Formula 1 (derivation with his parameter α_{2}=1/3) are given in the table below. Note that while Fehlberg's original tables begin indexing at 0, the standard mathematical convention for Runge–Kutta methods established by Butcher uses coefficients denoted as $a_{ij}$ with $i = 1, 2, \ldots, s$ and $j = 1, 2, \ldots, s$. Therefore, when implementing these methods in programming languages that use 0-based array indexing, there is a shift between the mathematical notation and array indices: what appears as $k_1$ in the mathematical formulation corresponds to index 0 in the implementation arrays.

Coefficients for RK4(5), Formula 1 (Fehlberg)
κ	α_{κ}	β_{κλ}					c_{κ} (4th order)	ĉ_{κ} (5th order)
κ	α_{κ}	λ=0	λ=1	λ=2	λ=3	λ=4	c_{κ} (4th order)	ĉ_{κ} (5th order)
0	0	0					1/9	47/450
1	2/9	2/9					0	0
2	1/3	1/12	1/4				9/20	12/25
3	3/4	69/128	−243/128	135/64			16/45	32/225
4	1	-17/12	27/4	-27/5	16/15		1/12	1/30
5	5/6	65/432	-5/16	13/16	4/27	5/144		6/25

Fehlberg outlines a solution to solving a system of n differential equations of the form:
$$\frac{dy_i}{dx} = f_i(x,y_1,y_2, \ldots, y_n), i=1,2,\ldots,n$$
to iterative solve for
$$y_i(x+h), i=1,2,\ldots,n$$
where h is an adaptive stepsize to be determined algorithmically:

The solution is the weighted average of six increments, where each increment is the product of the size of the interval, $h$, and an estimated slope specified by function f on the right-hand side of the differential equation.

$$\begin{align}
k_1&=h\cdot f(x+A(1) \cdot h,y) \\
k_2&=h\cdot f(x+A(2)\cdot h,y+B(2,1)\cdot k_1) \\
k_3&=h\cdot f(x+A(3)\cdot h, y+B(3,1)\cdot k_1+B(3,2)\cdot k_2 ) \\
k_4&=h\cdot f(x+A(4)\cdot h, y+B(4,1)\cdot k_1+B(4,2)\cdot k_2+B(4,3)\cdot k_3 ) \\
k_5&=h\cdot f(x+A(5)\cdot h, y+B(5,1)\cdot k_1+B(5,2)\cdot k_2+B(5,3)\cdot k_3+B(5,4)\cdot k_4 ) \\
k_6&=h\cdot f(x+A(6)\cdot h, y+B(6,1)\cdot k_1+B(6,2)\cdot k_2+B(6,3)\cdot k_3+B(6,4)\cdot k_4+B(6,5) \cdot k_5)
\end{align}$$

Then the weighted average is:

$$y(x+h) = y(x) + \hat{c}_1 k_1 + \hat{c}_2 k_2 + \hat{c}_3 k_3 + \hat{c}_4 k_4 + \hat{c}_5 k_5 + \hat{c}_6 k_6$$
The estimate of the truncation error is:
$$\mathrm{TE} = \left| (\hat{c}_1 - c_1) k_1 + (\hat{c}_2 - c_2) k_2 + (\hat{c}_3 - c_3) k_3 + (\hat{c}_4 - c_4) k_4 + (\hat{c}_5 - c_5) k_5 + (\hat{c}_6 - c_6) k_6 \right|$$

where $c_i$ and $\hat{c}_i$ are the 4th- and 5th-order weights from the embedded Runge–Kutta pair, and $k_i$ are the stage derivatives.

At the completion of the step, a new stepsize is calculated:

$$h_{\text{new}} = 0.9 \cdot h \cdot \left ( \frac {\varepsilon} {TE} \right )^{1/5}$$

If $\mathrm{TE} > \varepsilon$, then replace $h$ with $h_{\text{new}}$ and repeat the step. If $TE\leqslant\varepsilon$, then the step is completed. Replace $h$ with $h_{\text{new}}$ for the next step.

The coefficients found by Fehlberg for Formula 2 (derivation with his parameter α_{2} = 3/8) are given in the table below:

Coefficients for RK4(5), Formula 2 (Fehlberg)
κ	α_{κ}	β_{κλ}					c_{κ} (4th order)	ĉ_{κ} (5th order)
κ	α_{κ}	λ=0	λ=1	λ=2	λ=3	λ=4	c_{κ} (4th order)	ĉ_{κ} (5th order)
0	0	0					25/216	16/135
1	1/4	1/4					0	0
2	3/8	3/32	9/32				1408/2565	6656/12825
3	12/13	1932/2197	-7200/2197	7296/2197			2197/4104	28561/56430
4	1	439/216	-8	3680/513	-845/4104		-1/5	-9/50
5	1/2	-8/27	2	-3544/2565	1859/4104	-11/40		2/55

In another table in Fehlberg, coefficients for an RKF4(5) derived by D. Sarafyan are given:

Coefficients for Sarafyan's RK4(5), Table IV in Fehlberg
κ	α_{κ}	β_{κλ}					c_{κ} (4th order)	ĉ_{κ} (5th order)
κ	α_{κ}	λ=0	λ=1	λ=2	λ=3	λ=4	c_{κ} (4th order)	ĉ_{κ} (5th order)
0	0	0					1/6	1/24
1	1/2	1/2					0	0
2	1/2	1/4	1/4				2/3	0
3	1	0	-1	2			1/6	5/48
4	2/3	7/27	10/27	0	1/27			27/56
5	1/5	28/625	-1/5	546/625	54/625	-378/625		125/336

== See also ==
- List of Runge–Kutta methods
- Numerical methods for ordinary differential equations
- Runge–Kutta methods
