= Dormand–Prince method =

Method for solving differential equations

In numerical analysis, the Dormand–Prince (RKDP) method or DOPRI method, is an embedded method for solving ordinary differential equations (ODE). The method is a member of the Runge–Kutta family of ODE solvers. More specifically, it uses six function evaluations to calculate fourth- and fifth-order accurate solutions. The difference between these solutions is then taken to be the error of the (fourth-order) solution. This error estimate is very convenient for adaptive stepsize integration algorithms. Other similar integration methods are Fehlberg (RKF) and Cash–Karp (RKCK).

The Dormand–Prince method has seven stages, but it uses only six function evaluations per step because it has the "First Same As Last" (FSAL) property: the last stage is evaluated at the same point as the first stage of the next step. Dormand and Prince chose the coefficients of their method to minimize the error of the fifth-order solution. This is the main difference with the Fehlberg method, which was constructed so that the fourth-order solution has a small error. For this reason, the Dormand–Prince method is more suitable when the higher-order solution is used to continue the integration, a practice known as local extrapolation.

== Butcher tableau ==
The Butcher tableau is:

$0$
$\frac{1}{5}$	$\frac{1}{5}$
$\frac{3}{10}$	$\frac{3}{40}$	$\frac{9}{40}$
$\frac{4}{5}$	$\frac{44}{45}$	$-\frac{56}{15}$	$\frac{32}{9}$
$\frac{8}{9}$	$\frac{19372}{6561}$	$-\frac{25360}{2187}$	$\frac{64448}{6561}$	$-\frac{212}{729}$
$1$	$\frac{9017}{3168}$	$-\frac{355}{33}$	$\frac{46732}{5247}$	$\frac{49}{176}$	$-\frac{5103}{18656}$
$1$	$\frac{35}{384}$	$0$	$\frac{500}{1113}$	$\frac{125}{192}$	$-\frac{2187}{6784}$	$\frac{11}{84}$
	$\frac{35}{384}$	$0$	$\frac{500}{1113}$	$\frac{125}{192}$	$-\frac{2187}{6784}$	$\frac{11}{84}$	$0$
	$\frac{5179}{57600}$	$0$	$\frac{7571}{16695}$	$\frac{393}{640}$	$-\frac{92097}{339200}$	$\frac{187}{2100}$	$\frac{1}{40}$

The first row of b coefficients gives the fifth-order accurate solution, and the second row gives the fourth-order accurate solution.

== Applications ==
Dormand–Prince is the default method in the ode45 solver for MATLAB and GNU Octave and is the default choice for the Simulink's model explorer solver. It is an option in Python's SciPy ODE integration library and in Julia's ODE solvers library. Implementations for the languages Fortran, Java, C++, and Rust are also available.
