= John C. Butcher =

New Zealand mathematician

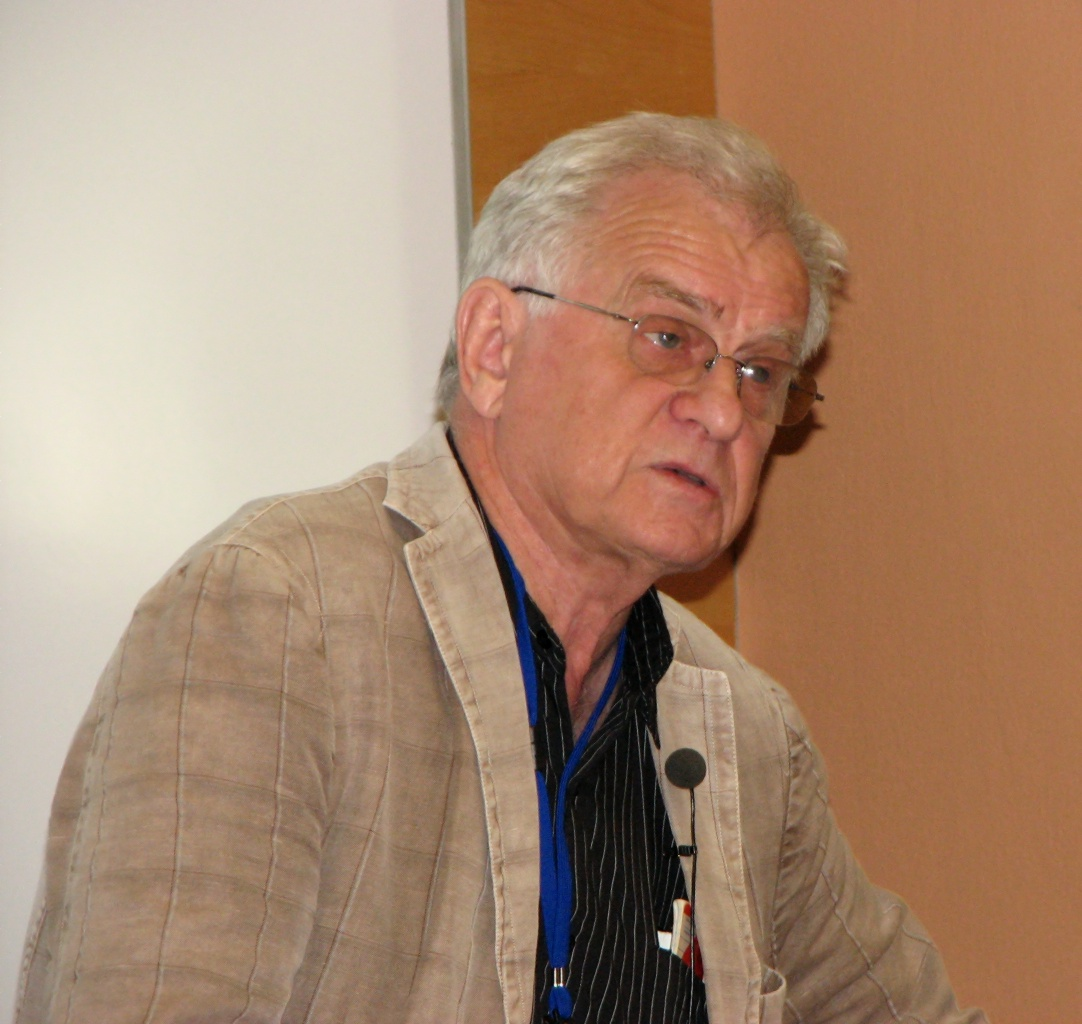
During International Conference on Computer Modelling and Simulation CSSim 2009

John Charles Butcher ONZM (born 31 March 1933) is a New Zealand mathematician who specialises in numerical methods for the solution of ordinary differential equations.

Butcher works on multistage methods for initial value problems, such as Runge-Kutta and general linear methods. The Butcher group and the Butcher tableau are named after him. More recently, he is investigating a new type of method with stability identical to that of a Runge-Kutta method.

== Biography ==
Positions held by John C. Butcher
- Lecturer, University of Sydney, 1959–1961.
- Senior Lecturer, University of Canterbury, 1961–1964.
- Computer Scientist, Stanford Linear Accelerator Center, 1965–1966.
- Professor of Mathematics, University of Auckland, 1966–1979.
- Head of Mathematics Department, University of Auckland, 1967–1973.
- Founded Department of Computer Science, University of Auckland, 1980.
- Professor of Computer Science, University of Auckland, 1980–1988.
- Head of Applied and Computational Mathematics Unit, University of Auckland, 1989–1994, 1997–1998.
- Professor of Mathematics, University of Auckland, 1989–1999.
- Emeritus Professor, University of Auckland, 1999–present.

Butcher studied mathematics at Auckland University College - BSc and MSc - and the University of Sydney - PhD (1961) and DSc. Positions held are as aside.

He was awarded the Jones Medal from the Royal Society of New Zealand in 2010, for his "exceptional lifetime work on numerical methods for the solution of differential equations and leadership in the development of New Zealand mathematical sciences." In 2011, he received the Van Wijngaarden Award.

In the 2013 Queen's Birthday Honours, Butcher was appointed an Officer of the New Zealand Order of Merit, for services to mathematics.

== Publications ==
- Butcher, J. C. (1975), "A stability property of implicit Runge-Kutta methods", BIT, 15 (4): 358–361, doi:10.1007/bf01931672.
- Butcher, John C. (2008), Numerical methods for ordinary differential equations (2nd ed.), John Wiley & Sons Ltd., doi:10.1002/9780470753767, ISBN 978-0-470-72335-7, MR 2401398.
- John C. Butcher: "Trees, B-series and exponential integrators", IMA Journal of Numerical Analysis Vol.30, No. 1 (Jan. 2010), pp. 131–140. DOI:10.1093/imanum/drn086.
- Butcher, John C. (2016), Numerical methods for ordinary differential equations (3rd ed.), John Wiley & Sons Ltd., doi:10.1002/9781119121534, ISBN 978-1-119-12150-3.
- J.C.Butcher:"Trees and B-series", Numerical Algorithms (2019), vol.81, pp. 1311–1325. https://doi.org/10.1007/s11075-018-0643-7
- John C. Butcher: "B-Series : Algebraic Analysis of Numerical Methods", Springer(SSCM, volume 55), ISBN 978-3030709556 (April, 2021).
