= Cat paradox =

Cat paradox may refer to

- Buttered cat paradox
- Falling cat problem
- Schrödinger's cat
