= Lie group integrator =

Method of numerical integration of partial differential equations

A Lie group integrator is a numerical integration method for differential equations built from coordinate-independent operations such as Lie group actions on a manifold. They have been used for the animation and control of vehicles in computer graphics and control systems/artificial intelligence research. These tasks are particularly difficult because they feature nonholonomic constraints.

== See also ==
- Euler integration
- Lie group
- Numerical methods for ordinary differential equations
- Parallel parking problem
- Runge–Kutta methods
- Variational integrator
