= Multisymplectic integrator =

Mumerical method for solving differential equations

In mathematics, a multisymplectic integrator is a numerical method for the solution of a certain class of partial differential equations, that are said to be multisymplectic. Multisymplectic integrators are geometric integrators, meaning that they preserve the geometry of the problems; in particular, the numerical method preserves energy and momentum in some sense, similar to the partial differential equation itself. Examples of multisymplectic integrators include the Euler box scheme and the Preissman box scheme.

== Multisymplectic equations ==
A partial differential equation (PDE) is said to be a multisymplectic equation if it can be written in the form
$$Kz_t + Lz_x = \nabla S(z),$$
where $z(t,x)$ is the unknown, $K$ and $L$ are (constant) skew-symmetric matrices and $\nabla S$ denotes the gradient of $S$. This is a natural generalization of $Jz_t = \nabla H(z)$, the form of a Hamiltonian ODE.

Examples of multisymplectic PDEs include the nonlinear Klein–Gordon equation $u_{tt} - u_{xx} = V'(u)$, or more generally the nonlinear wave equation $u_{tt} = \partial_x \sigma'(u_x) - f'(u)$, and the KdV equation $u_t + uu_x + u_{xxx} = 0$.

Define the 2-forms $\omega$ and $\kappa$ by
$$\omega(u,v) = \langle Ku, v \rangle \quad\text{and}\quad \kappa(u,v) = \langle Lu, v \rangle$$
where $\langle \,\cdot\, , \,\cdot\, \rangle$ denotes the dot product. The differential equation preserves symplecticity in the sense that
$$\partial_t \omega + \partial_x \kappa = 0.$$
Taking the dot product of the PDE with $u_t$ yields the local conservation law for energy:
$$\partial_t E(u) + \partial_x F(u) = 0$$
where
$$\begin{align}
E(u) &= S(u) - \tfrac{1}{2} \kappa(u_x,u) , \\[1ex]
F(u) &= \tfrac{1}{2} \kappa(u_t,u).
\end{align}$$
The local conservation law for momentum is derived similarly:
$$\partial_t I(u) + \partial_x G(u) = 0$$
where
$$\begin{align}
I(u) &= \tfrac{1}{2} \omega(u_x,u) , \\[1ex]
G(u) &= S(u) - \tfrac{1}{2} \omega(u_t,u).
\end{align}$$

== The Euler box scheme ==
A multisymplectic integrator is a numerical method for solving multisymplectic PDEs whose numerical solution conserves a discrete form of symplecticity. One example is the Euler box scheme, which is derived by applying the symplectic Euler method to each independent variable.

The Euler box scheme uses a splitting of the skew-symmetric matrices $K$ and $L$ of the form:
$$\begin{align}
K &= K_+ + K_- &\text{with}&& K_- &= -K_+^T, \\
L &= L_+ + L_- &\text{with}&& L_- &= -L_+^T.
\end{align}$$
For instance, one can take $K_+$ and $L_+$ to be the upper triangular part of $K$ and $L$, respectively.

Now introduce a uniform grid and let $u_{n,i}$ denote the approximation to $u(n\Delta{t}, i\Delta{x})$ where $\Delta{t}$ and $\Delta{x}$ are the grid spacing in the time- and space-direction. Then the Euler box scheme is
$$K_+ \partial_t^+ u_{n,i} + K_- \partial_t^- u_{n,i} + L_+ \partial_x^+ u_{n,i} + L_- \partial_x^- u_{n,i} = \nabla{S}(u_{n,i})$$
where the finite difference operators are defined by
$$\begin{align}
\partial_t^+ u_{n,i} &= \frac{u_{n+1,i} - u_{n,i}}{\Delta{t}}, & \partial_x^+ u_{n,i} &= \frac{u_{n,i+1} - u_{n,i}}{\Delta{x}}, \\[1ex]
\partial_t^- u_{n,i} &= \frac{u_{n,i} - u_{n-1,i}}{\Delta{t}}, & \partial_x^- u_{n,i} &= \frac{u_{n,i} - u_{n,i-1}}{\Delta{x}}.
\end{align}$$
The Euler box scheme is a first-order method, which satisfies the discrete conservation law
$$\partial_t^+ \omega_{n,i} + \partial_x^+ \kappa_{n,i} = 0$$
where
$$\begin{align}
\omega_{n,i} &= \mathrm{d}u_{n,i-1} \wedge K_+ \, \mathrm{d}u_{n,i} \\[1ex]
\kappa_{n,i} &= \mathrm{d}u_{n-1,i} \wedge L_+ \, \mathrm{d}u_{n,i}.
\end{align}$$

== Preissman box scheme ==
Another multisymplectic integrator is the Preissman box scheme, which was introduced by Preissman in the context of hyperbolic PDEs. It is also known as the centred cell scheme. The Preissman box scheme can be derived by applying the Implicit midpoint rule, which is a symplectic integrator, to each of the independent variables. This leads to the scheme
$$K \partial_t^+ u_{n,i+1/2} + L \partial_x^+ u_{n+1/2,i} = \nabla{S}(u_{n+1/2,i+1/2}),$$
where the finite difference operators $\partial_t^+$ and $\partial_x^+$ are defined as above and the values at the half-integers are defined by
$$\begin{align}
u_{n,i+1/2} &= \frac{u_{n,i} + u_{n,i+1}}{2}, \\[1ex]
u_{n+1/2,i} &= \frac{u_{n,i} + u_{n+1,i}}{2}, \\[1ex]
u_{n+1/2,i+1/2} &= \frac{u_{n,i} + u_{n,i+1} + u_{n+1,i} + u_{n+1,i+1}}{4}.
\end{align}$$
The Preissman box scheme is a second-order multisymplectic integrator which satisfies the discrete conservation law
$$\partial_t^+ \omega_{n,i} + \partial_x^+ \kappa_{n,i} = 0$$
where
$$\begin{align}
\omega_{n,i} &= \mathrm{d}u_{n,i+1/2} \wedge K \, \mathrm{d}u_{n,i+1/2} \\[1ex]
\kappa_{n,i} &= \mathrm{d}u_{n+1/2,i} \wedge L \, \mathrm{d}u_{n+1/2,i}.
\end{align}$$
