= Mimesis (mathematics) =

In mathematics, mimesis is the quality of a numerical method which imitates some properties of the continuum problem. The goal of numerical analysis is to approximate the continuum, so instead of solving a partial differential equation one aims to solve a discrete version of the continuum problem. Properties of the continuum problem commonly imitated by numerical methods are conservation laws, solution symmetries, and fundamental identities and theorems of vector and tensor calculus like the divergence theorem. Both finite difference or finite element method can be mimetic; it depends on the properties that the method has.

For example, a mixed finite element method applied to Darcy flows strictly conserves the mass of the flowing fluid.

The term geometric integration denotes the same philosophy.
