= Buttered cat paradox =

Joke about falling cats and buttered toast

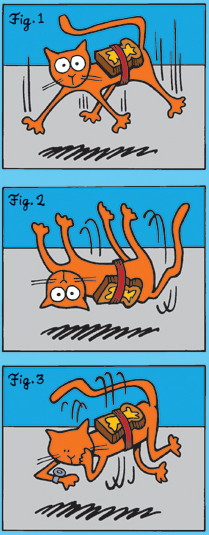
A cartoon illustration of the thought experiment

The buttered cat paradox is a common joke based on the combination of two adages:

- Cats always land on their feet.
- Buttered toast always lands buttered side down.

The paradox arises when one considers what would happen if one attached a piece of buttered toast (butter side up) to the back of a cat, then dropped the cat from a large height. The buttered cat paradox, submitted by artist John Frazee of Kingston, New York, won a 1993 Omni magazine competition about paradoxes. The basic premise, stating the conditions of the cat and bread and posed as a question, was presented in a routine by comic and juggler Michael Davis, appearing on The Tonight Show with Johnny Carson, July 22, 1988.

== Thought experiments ==
The buttered cat paradox has been highlighted as a paradigmatic example of a thought experiment. Some people jokingly maintain that the experiment produces an anti-gravity effect. They propose that as the cat falls toward the ground, it slows down and starts to rotate, eventually reaching a steady state of hovering a short distance from the ground while rotating at high speed as both the buttered side of the toast and the cat's feet attempt to land on the ground. In June 2003, Kimberly Miner won a Student Academy Award for her film Perpetual Motion. Miner based her film on a paper written by a high-school friend that explored the potential implications of the cat and buttered toast idea.

== In humor ==
The faux paradox has captured the imagination of science-oriented humorists. In May 1992, the Usenet Oracle Digest #441 included a question from a supplicant asking about the paradox. Testing the theory is the main theme in an episode of the comic book strip Jack B. Quick. The title character seeks to test this theory, leading to the cat hovering above the ground and the cat's wagging tail providing propulsion. The March 31, 2005, strip of the webcomic Bunny also explored the idea in the guise of a plan for a "Perpetual Motion MoggieToast 5k Power Generator", based on Sod's law. In Science Askew, Donald E. Simanek comments on this phenomenon.

Brazilian energy drink brand Flying Horse released a 2012 award-winning commercial that simulates the recreation of this phenomenon, which is then used to create perpetual energy.

== In reality ==
Cats possess the ability to turn themselves right side up in mid-air if they should fall upside-down, known as the cat righting reflex. This enables them to land on their feet if dropped from sufficient height.

A study at Manchester Metropolitan University involving dropping 100 slices of buttered toast under laboratory conditions established that it typically lands on the floor butter-side-down as a result of the manner in which it is typically dropped from a table, and the aerodynamic drag caused by the air pockets within the bread. The toast is typically butter-side-up when dropped. As it falls, it rotates; given the typical speed of rotation and the typical height of a table, a slice of toast that began butter-side-up on the table lands butter-side-down on the floor in 81% of cases.

== See also ==
- Falling cat problem
- High-rise syndrome
- List of paradoxes
- Schrödinger's cat
