= Parallel parking problem =

Robotics and planning computational problem

Animation of a car parallel parking, turning only its front wheels

The parallel parking problem is a motion planning problem in control theory and mechanics to determine the path a car must take to parallel park into a parking space. The front wheels of a car are permitted to turn, but the rear wheels must stay aligned. When a car is initially adjacent to a parking space, to move into the space it would need to move in a direction perpendicular to the allowed path of motion of the rear wheels. The admissible motions of the car in its configuration space are an example of a nonholonomic system.

== See also ==
- Automatic parking
- Bicycle and motorcycle dynamics
- Falling cat problem
- Moving sofa problem
