= Falling Cat =

1894 short film

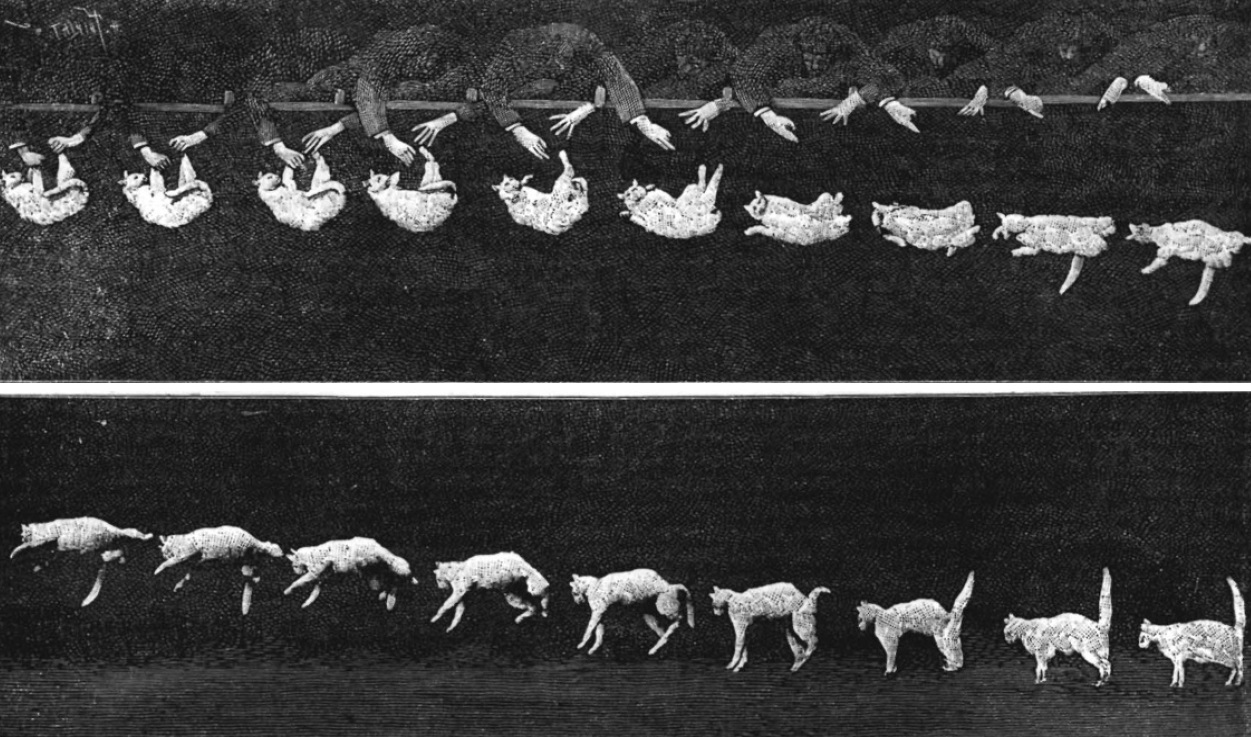
Falling Cat 1894

Falling Cat is an 1894 chronophotographic image depicting the successive phases of a feline falling down and landing on its feet, produced by Étienne-Jules Marey, a French scientist who researched locomotion. The sequence was shot at his station physiologique in Bois de Boulogne, Paris. It is believed to be the first chronophotographic sequence to show a live cat.

== See also ==
- Falling cat problem
