= High-rise syndrome =

Cat injury from falling from a building

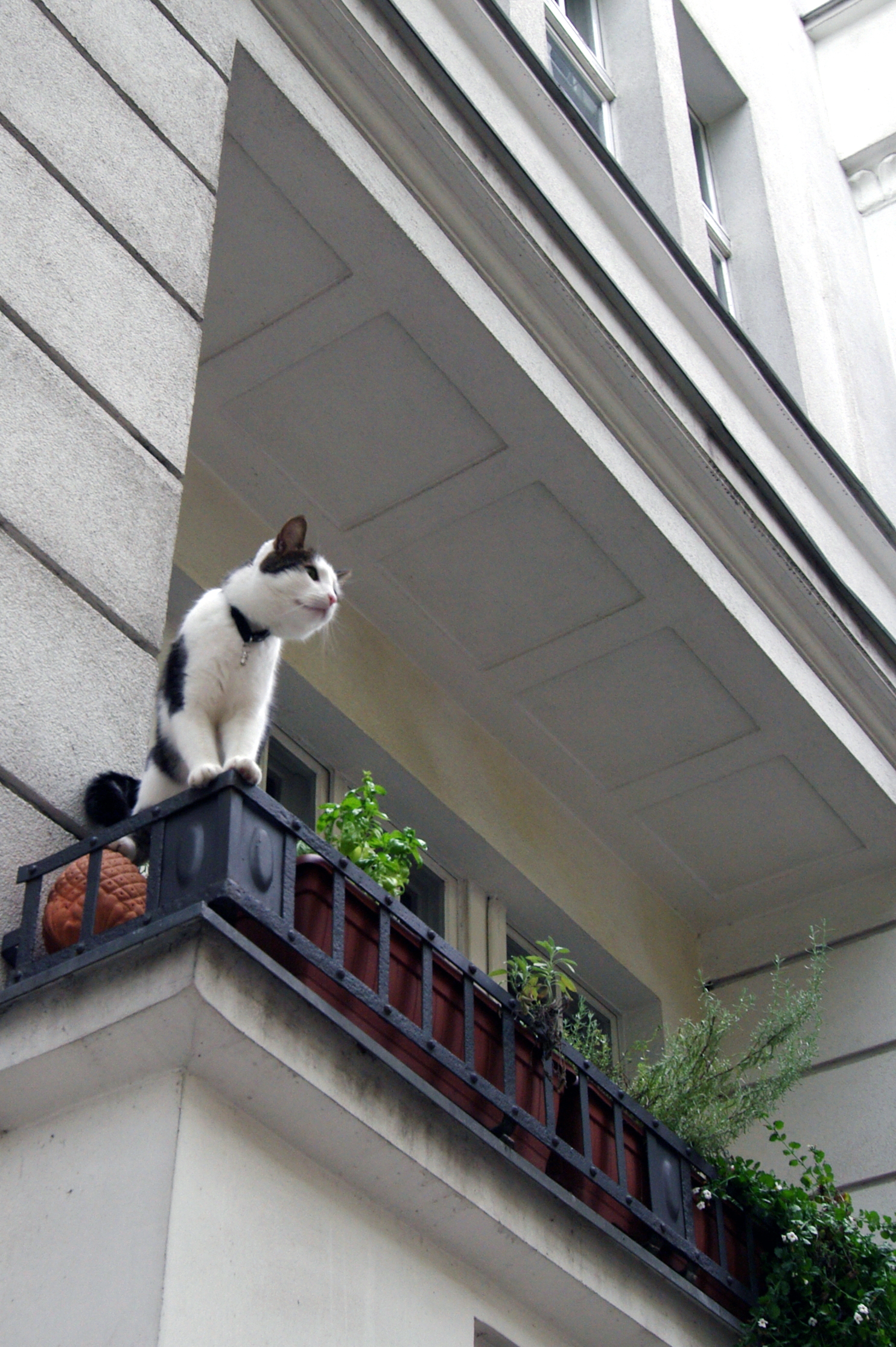
Cats have a natural attraction to high places.

High-rise syndrome is a veterinary term for injuries sustained by a cat falling from a building, typically higher than two stories (7–9 m (23–30 ft)).

== Injuries sustained by cats falling ==
Common injuries sustained in cats after a fall include:

- Broken bones, most often the jawbone as the cat's chin hits the ground; a broken jawbone and damaged or fractured teeth are the typical signs of a cat having sustained injuries in a fall.
- Injuries to the legs: joint injury; ruptured tendons; ligament injury; broken legs.
- Internal injuries, especially to the lungs

Studies done of cats that have fallen from two to 32 stories, and are still alive when brought to a veterinarian clinic, show that the overall survival rate is 90 percent of those treated.

In a study performed in 1987 it was reported that cats that survive a fall from less than six stories have greater injuries than cats who fall from higher than six stories. It has been proposed that this might happen because cats reach terminal velocity after righting themselves (see below) at about five stories, and after this point they are no longer accelerating, which causes them to relax, leading to less severe injuries than in cats who have fallen from less than six stories. Another possible explanation for this phenomenon is survivorship bias, that cats who die in falls are less likely to be brought to a veterinarian than injured cats, and thus many of the cats killed in falls from higher buildings are not reported in studies of the subject.

In a 2004 study, it was reported that cats falling from higher places suffered more severe injuries than those experiencing shorter drops.

== Righting ==
During a fall from a high place, a cat can reflexively twist its body and right itself using its acute sense of balance and its flexibility. This is known as the cat's "righting reflex". The minimum height required for this to occur in most cats (safely) would be around 90 cm (3.0 ft).

However, it has been argued that, after having reached terminal velocity, cats would orient their limbs horizontally such that their body hits the ground first. A 1987 study speculated that this is done after falling five stories to ensure the cat reaches a terminal velocity by thereafter relaxing and spreading their bodies to increase drag. In 2021, a Chicago cat jumped from the fifth floor of a burning building, bounced after landing on a grass lawn feet-first and survived with no injuries.

== Reasons cats fall from high places ==
Cats have a natural fondness for heights, which leads to falls when the cat is distracted or goes to sleep. If this were to occur in a tree, the cat might be able to save itself by grabbing on with its claws. Many building materials such as concrete and painted metal do not allow a cat to grip successfully.
