= Crouzeix's conjecture =

Theorem in matrix analysis

Crouzeix's conjecture is a problem in matrix analysis proposed by Michel Crouzeix in 2004, and it can be stated as follows:

$$\|f(A)\| \le 2 \sup_{z\in W(A)} |f(z)|,$$

where the set $W(A)$ is the field of values of a n×n (i.e. square) complex matrix $A$ and $f$ is a complex function that is analytic in the interior of $W(A)$ and continuous up to the boundary of $W(A)$. Slightly reformulated, the conjecture can also be stated as follows: for all square complex matrices $A$ and all complex polynomials $p$:

$$\|p(A)\| \le 2 \sup_{z\in W(A)} |p(z)|$$

holds, where the norm on the left-hand side is the spectral operator 2-norm.

== History ==
Crouzeix's theorem, proved in 2007, states that:

$$\|f(A)\| \le 11.08 \sup_{z\in W(A)} |f(z)|$$

(the constant $11.08$ is independent of the matrix dimension, thus transferable to infinite-dimensional settings).

Michel Crouzeix and Cesar Palencia proved in 2017 that the result holds for $1+\sqrt{2}$, improving the original constant of $11.08$. More recently, dimension-dependent improvements have been obtained: Malman, Mashreghi, O'Loughlin and Ransford showed that for each fixed dimension $N$ there exists a constant $C_N < 1+\sqrt{2}$ such that the inequality holds for all $N\times N$ matrices.

Related work connects the constant in Crouzeix-type inequalities to configuration constants arising from the Neumann–Poincaré operator and yields domain-dependent improvements of the Crouzeix–Palencia bound in certain settings.

The conjecture states that the constant can be refined to $2$.

== Special cases ==
Before the general case was resolved, the conjecture was shown to hold in several special cases. For instance, it holds for all normal matrices, for tridiagonal 3×3 matrices with elliptic field of values centered at an eigenvalue and for general n×n matrices that are nearly Jordan blocks.. Furthermore, Anne Greenbaum and Michael L. Overton provided numerical support for Crouzeix's conjecture.

== Proof ==
On July 27, 2026, neurosurgeon Shanmu Jin posted a preprint claiming a proof of Crouzeix's conjecture. Jin reported that the proof was obtained with the assistance of OpenAI's GPT-5.6 Sol, after which he checked the resulting argument. Greenbaum and Alex Townsend reported that they and Crouzeix had thoroughly reviewed the proof and believed it to be correct.

On August 4, 2026, Emiel Lorist and Felix Schwenninger posted an independent proof of the conjecture using a different argument. They reported that GPT-5.6 in its Sol variant "was used to explore proof strategies for this note".

== See also ==
- Von Neumann's inequality
