= C. William Gear =

British-American mathematician (1935–2022)

C. William Gear (Charles William "Bill" Gear; 1 February 1935, in London – 15 March 2022, in Princeton, New Jersey) was a British-American mathematician who specialized in numerical analysis and computer science. Gear was an American citizen.

Gear studied at the University of Cambridge with a bachelor's degree in 1957 and an M.A. in 1960, and at the University of Illinois, Urbana-Champaign with an M.S. in 1957 and a Ph.D. in 1960 under Abraham H. Taub with his thesis Singular Shock Intersections in Plane Flow. From 1960 to 1962, he worked as an engineer for IBM. From 1962 to 1990, he was a professor of computer science at the University of Illinois, Urbana-Champaign, where he was the head of the computer science department from 1985 to 1990. From 1992 to 2000, he was president of the NEC Research Institute in Princeton.

From 1966 to 1971, he was a consultant at Argonne National Laboratory.

Gear worked on numerical analysis, computer graphics, and software development. He was known for the development of BDF methods (originally introduced by the chemists Charles Francis Curtiss and Joseph Oakland Hirschfelder in 1952), a multi-step method for solving stiff systems of differential equations. Gear first published on BDF methods in 1966. Gear's work on BDF methods was a key component of the SPICE2 circuit simulator that pioneered CAD/CAM software for integrated circuit design and simulation.

Since his retirement from NEC, he has collaborated with Prof. Kevrekidis at Princeton on equation-free methods.

Gear was elected as a member into the National Academy of Engineering in 1992 for seminal work in methods and software for solving classes of differential equations and differential-algebraic equations of significance in applications. He was also a Fellow of the American Academy of Arts and Sciences and the IEEE. In 1987 he received an honorary doctorate from the Royal Institute of Technology in Stockholm.

== Selected works ==
- Computer Organization and Programming. McGraw Hill, 1969; 4th edition: 1985 (with emphasis on the personal computer)
- Introduction to Computer Science. Science Research Associates, Chicago 1973
- Programming in Pascal. Science Research Associates, 1983
- Numerical Initial Value Problems in Ordinary Differential Equations. Prentice Hall, 1971
- Backward Differentiation Formulas. Scholarpedia
