= Spectral abscissa =

In mathematics, the spectral abscissa of a matrix or a bounded linear operator is the greatest real part of the matrix's spectrum (its set of eigenvalues). It is sometimes denoted $\alpha(A)$. As a transformation $\alpha: \Mu^n \rightarrow \Reals$, the spectral abscissa maps a square matrix onto its largest real eigenvalue.

== Matrices ==
Let λ_{1}, ..., λ_{s} be the (real or complex) eigenvalues of a matrix A ∈ C^{n × n}. Then its spectral abscissa is defined as:

$$\alpha(A) = \max_i\{ \operatorname{Re}(\lambda_i) \} \,$$

In stability theory, a continuous system represented by matrix $A$ is said to be stable if all real parts of its eigenvalues are negative, i.e. $\alpha(A)<0$. Analogously, in control theory, the solution to the differential equation $\dot{x}=Ax$ is stable under the same condition $\alpha(A)<0$.

== See also ==
- Spectral radius
