= Von Neumann's inequality =

In operator theory, von Neumann's inequality, due to John von Neumann, states that, for a fixed contraction T, the polynomial functional calculus map is itself a contraction.

== Statement ==
For a contraction T acting on a Hilbert space and a polynomial p, then the norm of p(T) is bounded by the supremum of |p(z)| for z in the unit disk."

== Proof ==
The inequality can be proved by considering the unitary dilation of T, for which the inequality is obvious.

== Generalizations ==
This inequality is a specific case of Matsaev's conjecture. That is that for any polynomial P and contraction T on $L^p$

$$||P(T)||_{L^p\to L^p} \le ||P(S)||_{\ell^p\to\ell^p}$$

where S is the right-shift operator. The von Neumann inequality proves it true for $p=2$ and for $p=1$ and $p=\infty$ it is true by straightforward calculation. S.W. Drury has shown in 2011 that the conjecture fails in the general case.

== See also ==
- Crouzeix's conjecture
